= William McPherson Allen =

American businessperson

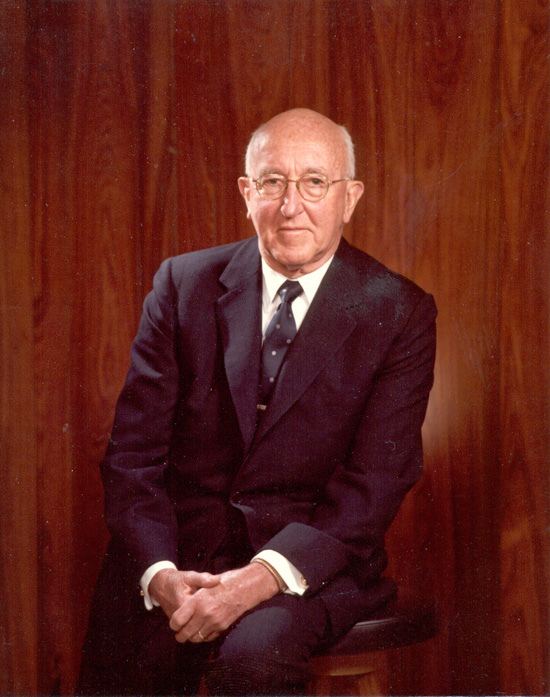
- Born: September 1, 1900; Lolo, Montana, U.S.
- Died: October 28, 1985 (aged 85); Seattle, Washington, U.S.
- Other name: Bill Allen
- Education: University of Montana
- Occupations: Former CEO, Boeing
- Term: 1945–1969
- Predecessor: Claire Egtvedt
- Successor: Thornton Wilson

William McPherson Allen (September 1, 1900 – October 28, 1985) was an American businessman in the aviation industry who served as the President of Boeing from 1945 to 1968.

== Life and career ==
Born in Lolo, Montana, he attended the University of Montana, where he became a member of the Sigma Chi fraternity. He graduated in 1925 from Harvard Law School, and joined the Board of Boeing Air Transport in 1930 while remaining an employee of his Seattle law firm, Donworth, Todd & Higgins. A year later he joined the Board of Boeing Airplane Company as corporate counsel.

Following the death of Boeing president Philip G. Johnson in 1944, Chairman Claire Egtvedt was tasked with appointing his replacement. Feeling that none of the company's senior engineers had a sufficiently broad background to run the company, he turned to Bill Allen. Considering himself unqualified to run an engineering company, Allen at first declined the offer before finally accepting. Allen served as the president of the Boeing Company from September 1, 1945, until April 29, 1968. He also served as the chairman of the Boeing Company from 1968 through 1972. While he was president of Boeing, he made the famous decision in 1952 to "bet the company", when he authorized construction of the Boeing 367-80 and again when he authorized the launch of development of the Boeing 707. He also participated in launching other planes of renown, among them the Boeing 727, Boeing 737, and Boeing 747.

In 1966, Allen asked Malcolm T. Stamper to spearhead production of the new 747 airplane on which the company's future was riding. This was a monumental engineering and management challenge, and included construction of the world's biggest factory in which to build the 747 at Everett, Washington, a plant which is the size of 40 football fields.

== Recognition and awards ==
In 1965, Allen received the Vermilye Medal from The Franklin Institute.

In 1971, Allen received the Tony Jannus Award ` for his distinguished contributions to commercial aviation.

In 1971, Allen was inducted into the National Aviation Hall of Fame in Dayton, Ohio. For his lifelong contributions to aviation.

In 1975, Allen was inducted into the International Air & Space Hall of Fame.

In 1975, Allen was one of the first four living members inducted into the Fortune magazine National Business Hall of Fame. In 2003 an article in Fortune by Jim Collins ranked Allen #2 among "The 10 Greatest CEOs of All Time."

== Personal life ==
In the last years of his life, Allen suffered from Alzheimer's disease. He died in Seattle on October 28, 1985, at the age of 85.

Allen is profiled in Senator John McCain's and Mark Salter's 2007 book, Hard Call: Great Decisions and the Extraordinary People Who Made Them.

Business positions
Preceded by Claire Egtvedt	CEO of Boeing; 1945-1968	Succeeded by Thornton Wilson
