= Claire Egtvedt =

American CEO and engineer (1872–1975)

Clairmont L. Egtvedt
- Born: October 18, 1892; Stoughton, Wisconsin
- Died: October 19, 1975 (aged 83); Seattle, Washington
- Education: University of Washington
- Occupation(s): Businessman and engineer
- Title: President and CEO, Boeing
- Term: 1933-1939, 1944-1945
- Predecessor: Philip G. Johnson
- Successor: William McPherson Allen
- Spouse: Evelyn Smith Egtvedt (m. 1926–1975)
- Parent(s): Sjur Pedersen Egtvedt; Mary Ruble

Clairmont L. "Claire" Egtvedt (October 18, 1892 – October 19, 1975) was an airplane designer and president and chairman of the Boeing Company. Along with Ed Wells, he is considered to be the father of the Boeing B-17 bomber.

Egtvedt was chief engineer on airplanes such as the B-1 mailplane, Boeing Model 15 and Boeing Model 21 pursuit airplanes, and the Boeing Model 40 airliner-mailplane. Though promoted to the executive ranks, he also participated heavily the design of the Boeing Model 80, XB-15, and B-17 models. As president, and later chairman of Boeing he oversaw and approved the development of the B-47, B-52, 707, 727,737, and 747. Flight Global ranked Egtvedt 2nd behind William McPherson Allen as most impactful Boeing boss.

== Biography ==
Born just outside Stoughton, WI in 1892, Egtvedt was the son of Sjur Egtvedt, a Norwegian immigrant, and Mary (Ruble) Egtvedt, a first generation Norwegian-American. Egtvedt was raised in a tight-knit ethnic community. Egtvedt attended high school in Stoughton, where he played basketball and was a track champion. The family moved to Seattle, WA in 1911, settling in the Scandinavian neighborhood of Ballard.

Egtvedt (along with his fellow future Boeing chairman, Philip G. Johnson) was hired by William E. Boeing as a draftsman straight out of the University of Washington College of Engineering in 1917. Egtvedt's ability became immediately apparently to Bill Boeing, who would recollect that Egtvedt "took to the aircraft engineering very readily". Egtvedt rose quickly, becoming chief engineer by the early 1920s.

In 1922, the aircraft industry was suffering a debilitating downturn due to a market flooded with World War I surplus aircraft. Bill Boeing was digging deep into his own pockets to make payroll, the craftsmen on the shop floor were building furniture, and any aircraft manufacturing that was occurring was of other people's designs (the GAX airplanes and Thomas-Morse fighters). Egtvedt knew the importance of developing new products, not just from a business standpoint, but from a technical proficiency standpoint. Egtvedt confronted Boeing, declaring, "We are building airplanes, not cement sidewalks!" Egtvedt convinced Boeing that he had to allow his engineering staff to start designing airplanes again. A year later, the highly successful Boeing PW-9 fighter first flew. A whole family of successful fighters followed, along with Boeing's first commercial airliners the Model 40 mailplane and subsequent Model 80 airliner.

After becoming the company's vice president in 1926, Egtvedt continued to push the company's airplane designs forward, helping define the configuration of the seminal Model 247. Under Egtvedt's watch, Boeing shifted from producing small pursuit aircraft to large bombers and commercial aircraft. At Egtvedt's direction, the company invested its limited resources into projects such as the B-17, Boeing 307 Stratoliner, Boeing 314 Clipper, paving the way for Boeing to become the premier manufacturer of large airplanes. For his role in creating the XB-15 and B-17 bombers, Egtvedt is often referred to as "Father of the Four Engine Bomber".

Egtvedt was named chairman of the Boeing Airplane Company in 1935, following the dissolution of United Aircraft and Transport Corporation. He remained in this role until his retirement in 1966. Under his stewardship as chairman, Boeing embarked on the sequence of airplane development that has come to define the company: the B-29, B-47, B-52, and finally the first of the 7-series family of jets, the 707, 727, and 737.

Egtvedt was named an Alumnus Summa Laude Dignatus of the University of Washington in 1957.

Egtvedt died at his home in Seattle in 1975.
