= Boeing Everett Factory =

Airplane assembly facility in Washington state

Boeing Everett Production Facility
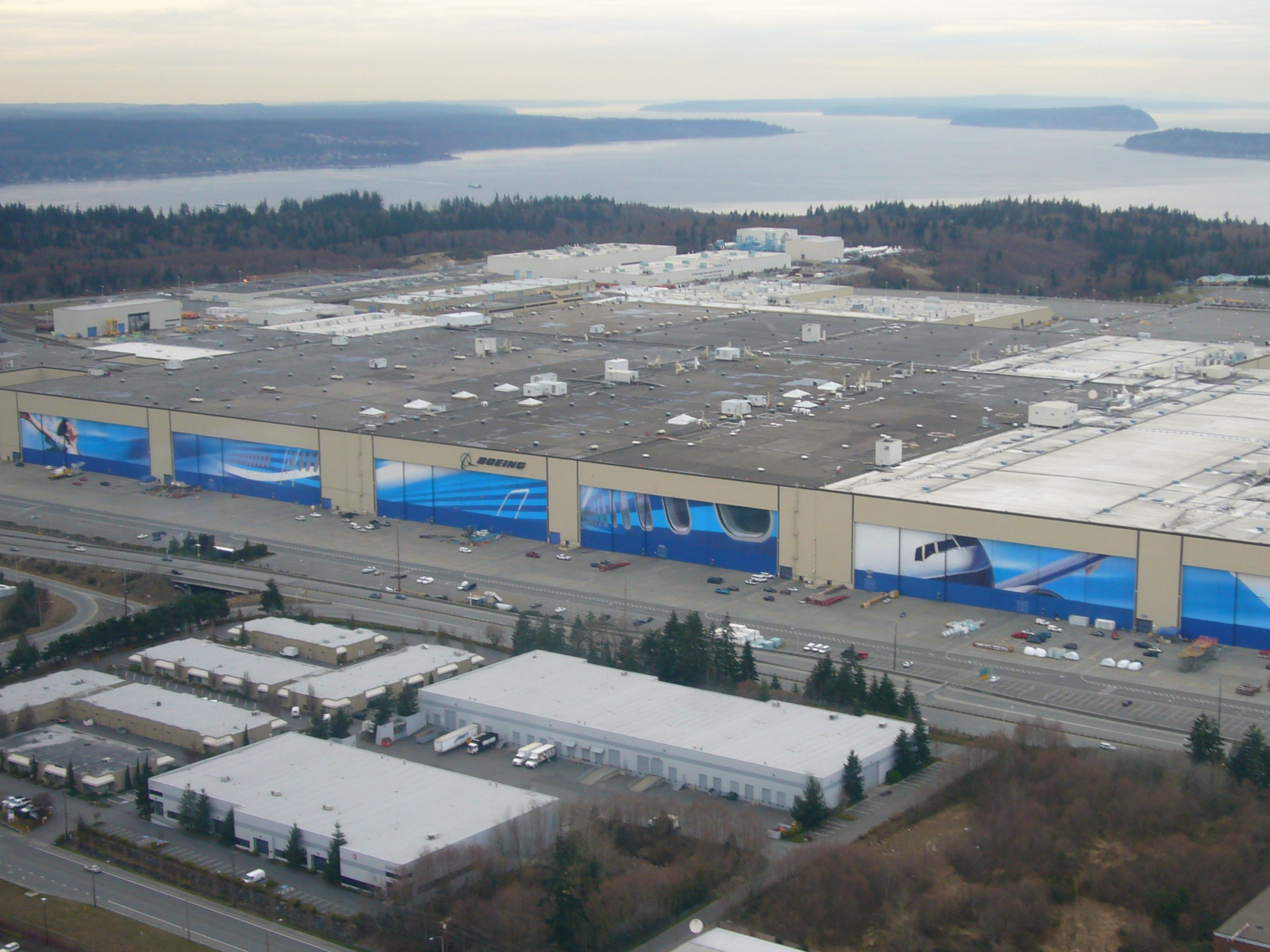
- Aerial view of the main assembly building in 2008 showing mural across hangar doors
- Built: 1967
- Location: 3003 West Casino Road Everett, Washington; Everett, Washington, United States
- Coordinates: 47°55′32″N 122°16′19″W
- Industry: Aerospace
- Products: Airplane assembly
- Employees: 30,000
- Architect: Boeing
- Style: Industrial
- Area: Total: 1,000 acres (400 ha); Main building: 98.3 acres (398,000 m^{2})
- Volume: Main building: 472,370,319 cubic feet (13,376,037.9 m^{3}), see List of largest buildings
- Owner: Boeing Commercial Airplanes

The Boeing Everett Factory, officially the Everett Production Facility, is an airplane assembly facility operated by Boeing in Everett, Washington, United States. It sits on the north side of Paine Field and includes the largest building in the world by volume at over 472 million cubic feet (13,400,000 m^{3}), which covers 98.3 acres (39.8 ha).

The entire complex covers approximately 1,000 acres (400 ha) and spans both sides of State Route 526 (named the Boeing Freeway). The factory was built in 1967 for the Boeing 747 and has since been expanded several times to accommodate new airliners, including the 767, 777, and 787 programs. More than 5,000 widebody aircraft have been built at the Everett factory since it opened. Production of the Boeing 737 MAX at the Everett plant began in 2026.

== Facilities ==
The Boeing Everett complex sits on 1,000 acres (400 ha) in southwestern Everett, about 22 miles (35 km) north of Seattle. It includes up to 200 separate buildings and facilities, mostly on the north and east sides of Paine Field's main runway, and straddles both sides of State Route 526 (named the Boeing Freeway). The complex includes a fire station, a medical clinic, a gymnasium, on-site security, and seven restaurants and cafes. As of 2022, Boeing has 30,000 workers at its Everett site who are scheduled in three shifts, primarily during daytime hours. The company is the largest employer in Everett and Snohomish County.

The main assembly building, immediately north of the Boeing Freeway, covers 98.3 acres (398,000 m^{2}) and is organized into six production lines that are separated by walls, offices, and other spaces. It is the world's largest building by volume at 472,370,319 cubic feet (13,376,037.9 m^{3}) of interior space according to Guinness World Records; the building is large enough to fit all of Disneyland or 75 American football fields. The production lines move at a rate of 1.5 inches (3.8 cm) per minute and are guided by 26 overhead cranes that move along 31 miles (50 km) of track. These cranes are suspended along the roof trusses, which are 300 to 350 feet (91 to 107 m) long and are supported by columns that are 90 feet (27 m) tall. A network of pedestrian and utilities tunnels span 2.33 miles (3.75 km) under the factory floor; employees also use a shared fleet of 1,300 bicycles and tricycles to move around the factory floor.

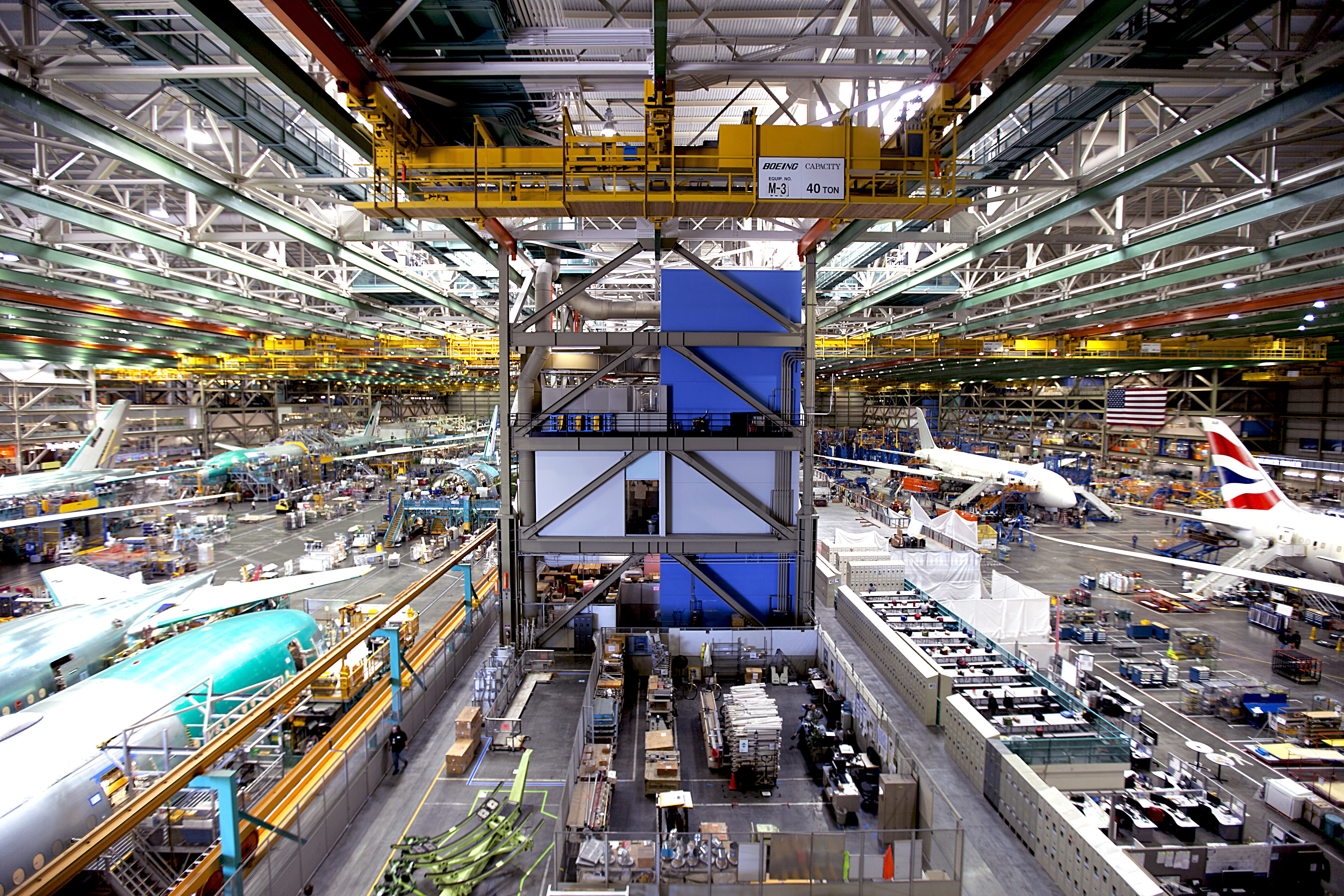
Interior of the main assembly building between two production lines

The main building is 114 feet (35 m) tall and has six hangar doors that are each 82 feet (25 m) tall and 300 to 350 feet (91 to 107 m) wide. The doors have a six-part mural that was recognized as the world's largest digital image in 2006 by Guinness World Records. The building has a central ventilation system but lacks air conditioning; it is instead cooled by opening the doors for outdoor air. The building is heated through residual warming from employees and equipment, including the 1 million overhead lights in the factory. An urban legend states that clouds used to form inside the main building due to its size prior to the installation of upgraded ventilation systems. Adjacent buildings include a composite wing manufacturing plant with 1.2 million square feet (110,000 m^{2}) of floor space; paint and seal buildings; and an auxiliary fuselage assembly plant for the Boeing 777X.

The north side of the factory complex is connected to the flight line at Paine Field via a taxiway that crosses over the Boeing Freeway west of Airport Road; airplanes are towed from the factory to flight line facilities at night to avoid disrupting traffic. The south side includes a set of three paint hangars, a delivery center with conference rooms, and parking spaces for airplanes. The flight line area connects to the main runway at Paine Field, which is 9,010 feet (2,750 m) long and is the only one at the airport that can accommodate jetliners. The runway has also been used for commercial service since the opening of a new passenger terminal at the airport in 2019. Additional spaces for parked airplanes are on the west side of the runway and southwest of the main building; Paine Field's short crosswind runway has also occasionally been used to park airplanes since 2010; the runway and an adjacent taxiway have been leased by Boeing from the county government to store airplanes.

In 2007, an empty building on the campus was used by Japanese railcar manufacturer Kinki Sharyo to assemble a fleet of Link light rail trains for Sound Transit.

== History ==
Boeing opened its first facilities in Everett on October 13, 1943, at a former auto garage to produce sections for the Boeing B-17 Flying Fortress. The company had several small shops in the city, but its presence in the area was reduced by 1963. The first 25 orders for the Boeing 747, to be the world's largest jetliner, were sold to Pan American World Airways for $525 million (equivalent to $5.2 billion in 2025) in March 1966. The program would require a larger facility than the Boeing Renton Factory, which was instead planned to be used for the conceptual 2707 supersonic airliner. Among the sites considered by Boeing for a new factory were Monroe, Washington; McChord Air Force Base near Tacoma, Washington; Moses Lake, Washington; Cleveland, Ohio; and Walnut Creek, California.

On June 17, 1966, the company announced that it had selected a site adjacent to Paine Field as the future home of its Boeing 747 assembly plant. Boeing purchased 780 acres (320 ha) north of the airport, which had primarily been used by the U.S. military and small businesses; a 75-year lease for use of Paine Field was also signed with the county government, which owned the airport. The company had already spent several months acquiring properties around the airport in preparation of the announcement and cleared parts of the site by late May.

The 158-million-cubic-foot (4,500,000 m^{3}) factory, planned to become the world's largest building by volume, was built in sections beginning in late June. The first section housed a mockup of the Boeing 747 that had been under assembly at the Renton factory. A railroad spur connecting the site to the mainline tracks at Mukilteo was constructed through Japanese Gulch. The first 113 workers at the Everett factory began work on January 3, 1967, and prepared for the assembly of the relocated Renton mockup. The factory was officially opened on May 1, 1967, four months after the first workers had arrived to start construction of the 747. Construction of the factory involved 4.5 million cubic yards (3,400,000 m^{3}) of soil to be excavated.

The main factory building was originally 43 acres (17 ha) and later expanded by 45 percent in 1979 as part of the Boeing 767 program and another 50 percent in 1990 for the Boeing 777. The company acquired 68 acres (28 ha) of Paine Field property from the county government in 1989 to expand its flight line.

To accommodate the Dreamlifter, a converted 747-400 which delivered 787 sections to the plant, a base was constructed on the western edge of Paine Field's runway. Opening in October 2013, the 17-acre (69,000 m^{2}) base, called the Dreamlifter Operations Center, was funded by Snohomish County with $35 million in bonds; it is owned by the county via the airport, with Boeing originally leasing the site and servicing the bonds. Following Boeing's decision to shutter the 787 production line in Everett and consolidate 787 production in South Carolina, the lease on the Dreamlifter Operations Center was transferred to FedEx for use as a cargo base. The former 787 production line was replaced by the North Line of the Boeing 737 MAX program, which began operations in July 2026. The MAX line moves in a ten-day working cycle.

Several workers at the Everett facility tested positive for COVID-19 in early March 2020, prior to a full shutdown of operations. The factory was shut down for three weeks until workers were able to return with mandatory face masks, social distancing, and staggered start times to reduce potential exposure.

As of 2025, the Everett facility has 30 Boeing 777X airframes in storage on unused runways—some for as long as six years. The factory had moved workers from the 777X program to complete fuselage repairs on the Boeing 787 that were completed in February 2025. Additional work to repair 737 MAX fuselages is expected to continue in what is described as Everett's "shadow factory".

== Current production aircraft ==
=== Boeing 767 ===
The Boeing 767 (out of production) is a mid-size, wide-body, twin-engine, jet airliner. First introduced in 1979 to complement the larger 747, the aircraft was capable of carrying 218 passengers in a typical three-class configuration over a range of 5,990 nautical miles (6,890 mi; 11,090 km) and a cruising speed of Mach 0.80 (530 mph, 851 km/h, 470 kn).

Production of passenger variants ended in 2017 after its successor, the 787 Dreamliner, entered service in 2011. Freighter and military variants remain in limited production.

Two variants are in production as of 2023:

- 767-300F (Freighter)
- KC-46 Pegasus

=== Boeing 777 ===
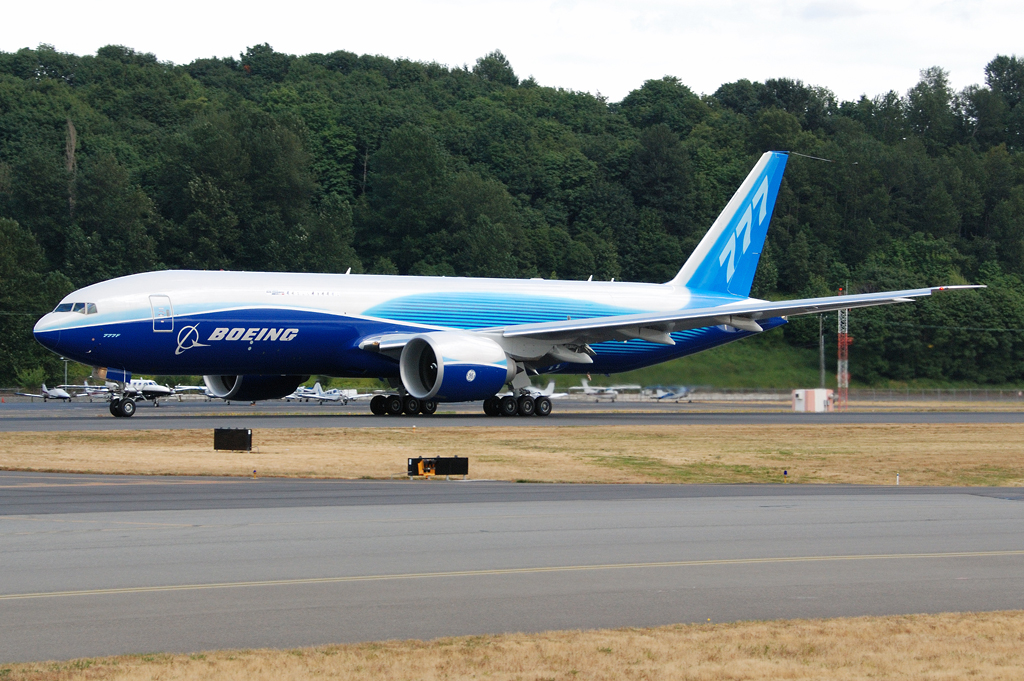
A Boeing 777 Freighter before a test flight

The Boeing 777 is a large-size, wide-body, twin-engine, jet airliner. Production of this plane began in 1993. As of November 2023, the factory is being retooled to produce the 777X, the next-generation of the aircraft. The 777-9 provides seating for 426 passengers and a range of over 7,285 nmi (13,492 km; 8,383 mi).

Two variants are in production as of 2024:

- 777-9
- 777F (Freighter)

=== Boeing 737 MAX ===
The Boeing 737 MAX is a mid-size, narrow-body, twin-engine, jet airliner. Production of the aircraft was expected to begin in the second half of 2024, but was delayed by several years. It will be the fourth production line for the Boeing 737 MAX and is intended allow for added production capacity beyond that of the Boeing Renton Factory to meet demand. The line replaces the discontinued Boeing 787 line at the factory.

In January 2024, the FAA announced it would not grant any production expansion of the 737 MAX until it was satisfied that more stringent quality assurance measures had been enacted, stemming from the in-flight loss of a door plug on a MAX 9 jet. No timeline was then given on when it would do so.

Boeing began hiring for the MAX 10 production line in Everett in January 2026 and activated the North Line in early July. The fuselages for the MAX are delivered from Wichita, Kansas, via railcars; the plane's wings and other structural elements are produced in Renton and delivered on trucks.

== Former production aircraft ==
=== Boeing 747 ===
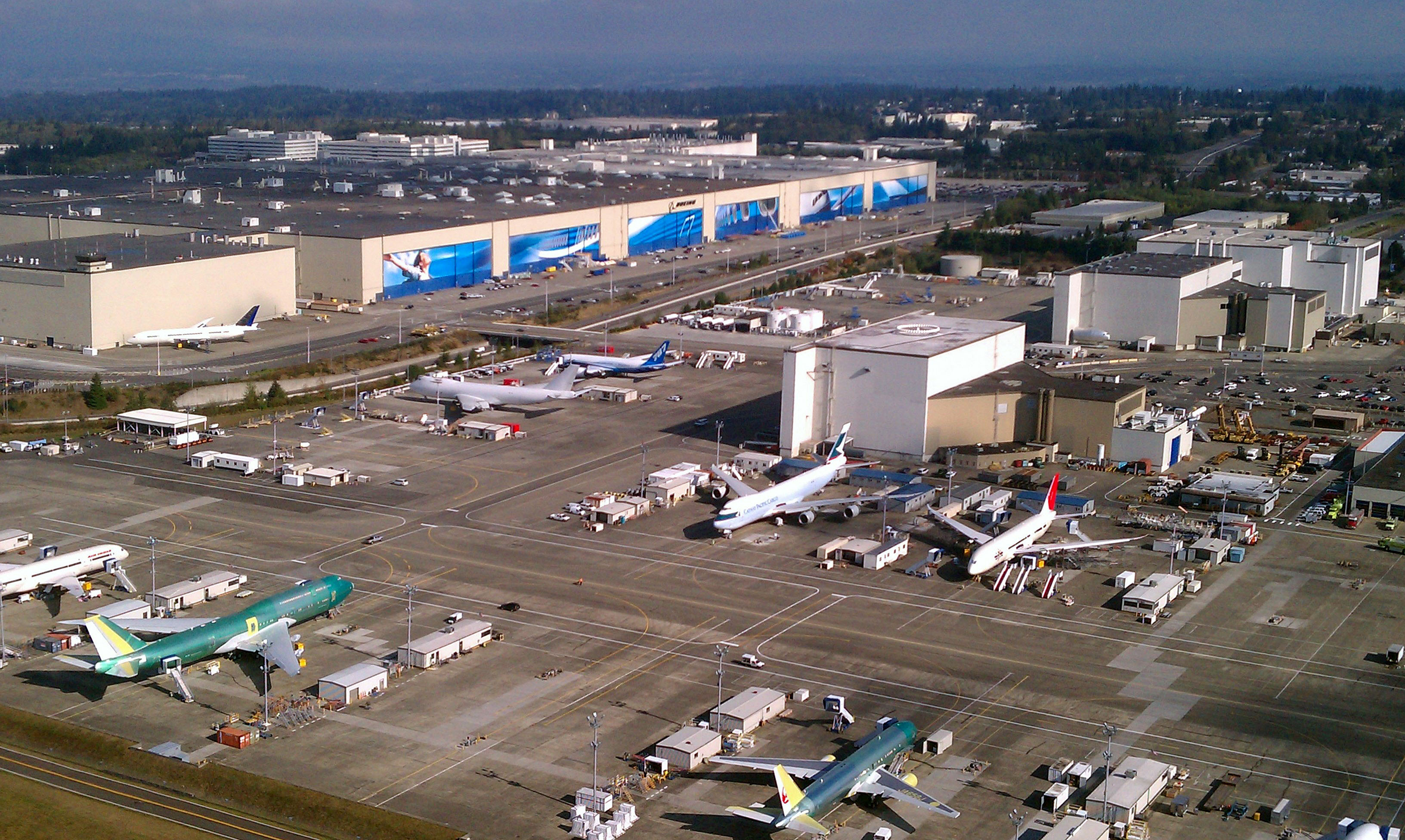
The flight line area, including paint hangars, next to the main assembly building in 2011

The Boeing 747 is a large-size, wide-body, four-engine, jet airliner. The 747-8I, the last passenger variant in production, is capable of carrying 467 passengers in a typical three-class configuration, has a range of 8,000 nmi (9,200 mi; 15,000 km) and a cruising speed Mach 0.855 (570 mph, 918 km/h, 495 kn). The Boeing 747 was one of the first wide-body aircraft to be produced and was the first jet to use a wide-body configuration for carrying passengers. Because of the vast size of the 747, the Boeing Everett Factory was designed and built to accommodate the assembly of these large planes as there was not enough room at the Boeing facilities in Seattle. Production of this aircraft began in 1967 and continued until 2022, with the last 747-8F (N863GT) rolling out in December for customer Atlas Air.

=== Boeing 787 ===
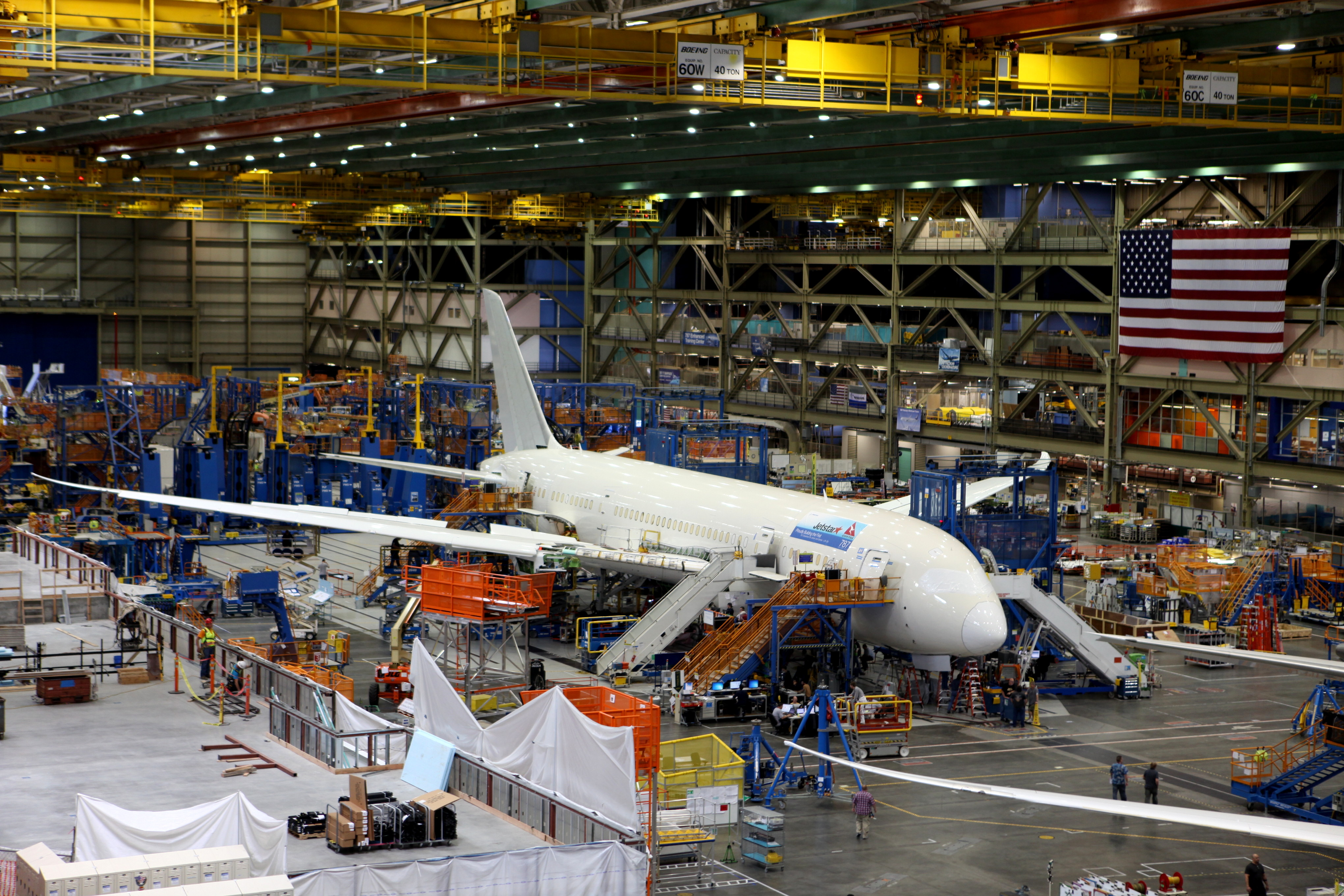
Jetstar's first 787 being built

The Boeing 787 Dreamliner is a mid-size, wide-body, twin-engine jet airliner. The current passenger variants in production, are capable of carrying 242–290 passengers in a typical two-class configuration, have a range of 7,355–7,635 nmi (8,464–8,786 mi; 13,621–14,140 km) and a cruising speed of Mach 0.85 (562 mph, 902 km/h, 487 kn). Production of this plane began in 2006.

In February 2011, Boeing announced that some 787 work was being moved to its plant in South Carolina, in order to relieve overcrowding of 787s at Everett caused by large volumes of 787 orders. In July 2014, Boeing announced that the 787-10 variant, the longest variant of the 787, would be produced exclusively in South Carolina as the fuselage pieces for that variant are too large for the Dreamlifter to fit for transport to Everett.

Undertaking drastic cost-cutting measures in the wake of the COVID-19 pandemic and its resulting impact on aviation, Boeing announced in July 2020 that it would consider consolidating all of its 787 assembly in a single location; the company chose to move all production to South Carolina on October 1, causing backlash from the Washington state government. The move was completed in February 2021; it was cemented with Boeing's agreement to transfer its lease of the Dreamlifter Operations Center to package courier FedEx in April 2021. FedEx, which takes over the lease on November 1, plans to use it for its cargo airline operations.

The two 787 variants formerly produced in Everett were the 787-8 and the 787-9.

== Tours ==
Following several months of unofficial visits, Boeing began offering factory tours with the first rollout of the 747 in 1968. The first year of tours had over 39,000 visitors, which later grew to 55,000 annually by the 1980s; a dedicated tour building was constructed in 1984 and later replaced by the Future of Flight Aviation Center in 2005. The center includes an exhibit gallery, a Boeing Store gift shop, café, and outdoor observation deck. As of 2020, over 150,000 people come each year to visit the factory. The Boeing factory tour was suspended from 2020 to 2023 due to the COVID-19 pandemic.

Records
Preceded by NASA Vehicle Assembly Building	Largest building by volume 1967–present	Succeeded by Incumbent
