= Boeing Global Services =

Division of the Boeing Company that services airplanes

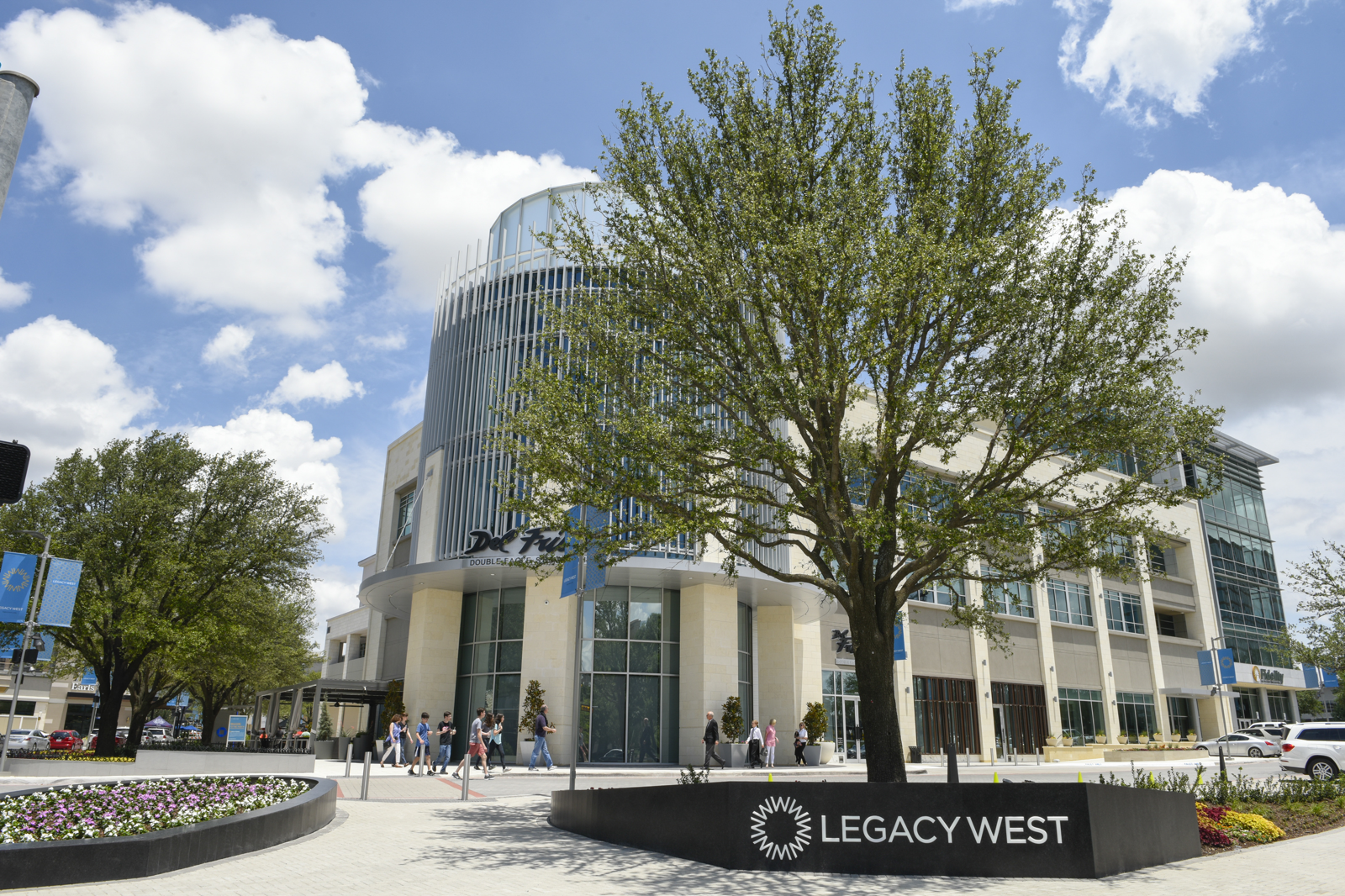
- Boeing Global Services headquarters in the Legacy West development in Plano, Texas
- Company type: Division
- Industry: Aviation
- Founded: July 1, 2017; 8 years ago
- Headquarters: Legacy West, Plano, Texas, United States
- Area served: Worldwide
- Key people: D. Christopher Raymond (President and CEO)
- Revenue: ▲US$20.0 billion (2023)
- Operating income: ▲US$3.6 billion (2023)
- Total assets: ▲US$16.7 billion (2023)
- Number of employees: ▼21,662 (2024)
- Parent: The Boeing Company
- Website: services.boeing.com
- Footnotes / references Financials as of December 31, 2024. References

Boeing Global Services (BGS) is a division of the Boeing Company. It provides aftermarket support, such as maintenance and upgrades, to customers who purchase equipment from the company's other divisions, Boeing Commercial Airplanes and Boeing Defense, Space & Security, or other manufacturers. The division was established on July 1, 2017, and is headquartered in the Legacy West development in Plano, Texas.

BGS is one of the most profitable divisions of Boeing, earning a record US$19.1 billion in 2023 in revenue at a time when the company's other two divisions operated at a loss. The revenue split is 60% commercial and 40% military.

Services offered by the division include aircraft maintenance, converting aircraft to freighters, parts distribution, and developing technology. However, despite the company's financial success, it has also faced frustration from customers in its parts business in response to long lead times and increased prices for parts.
