= Kelly Ortberg =

American business executive (born 1960)

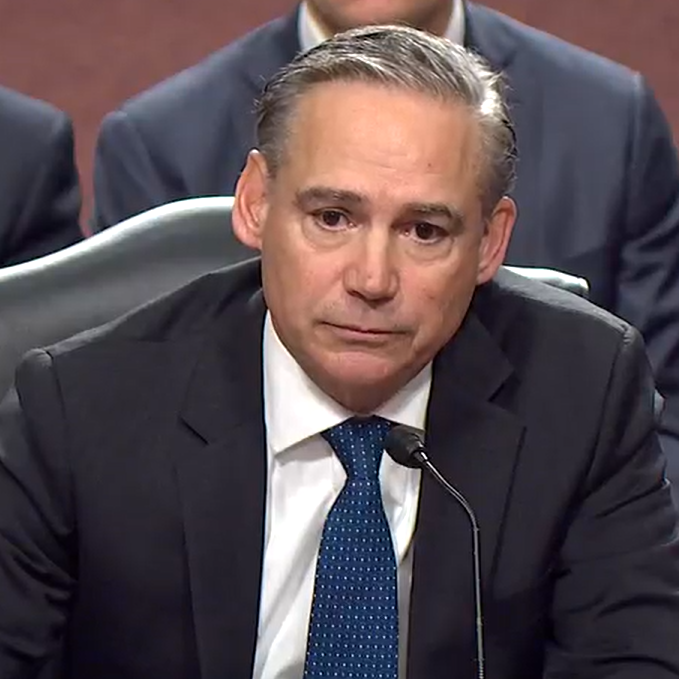
- Ortberg testifies at a Senate hearing, April 2025
- Born: Robert Kelly Ortberg; April 1960 (age 66); Dubuque, Iowa, U.S.
- Education: University of Iowa (BS)
- Title: President and CEO, Boeing
- Term: August 2024–
- Predecessor: Dave Calhoun
- Spouse: Valerie Dee Heitman (m. 1983)
- Children: 2

Signature
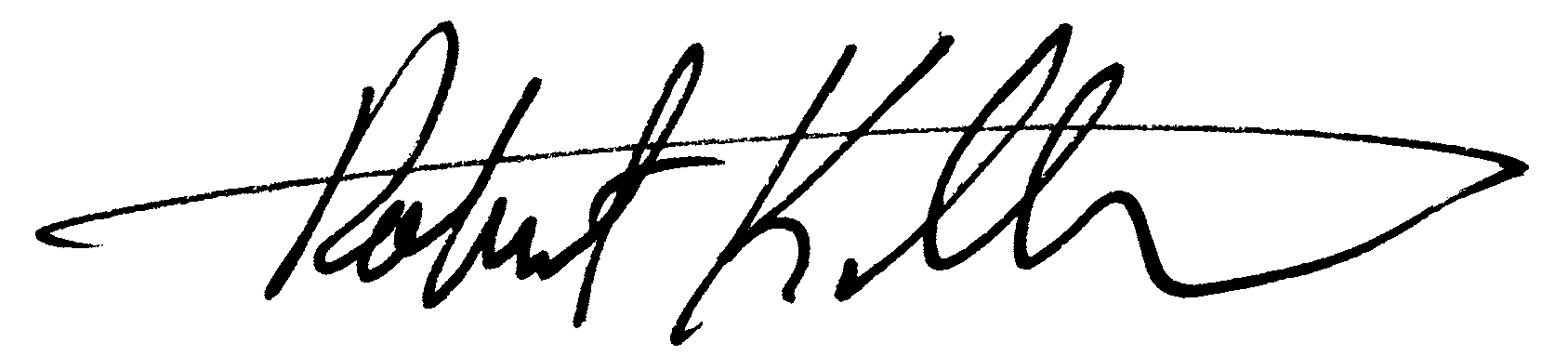

Robert Kelly Ortberg (born April 1960) is an American business executive and former engineer who is the current president and CEO of Boeing. He was previously the president and CEO of Rockwell Collins.

== Early life and education ==
Robert Kelly Ortberg was born to Carol M. (née Koelker) and Robert L. Ortberg in April 1960. He is a native of Dubuque, Iowa. He graduated with a bachelor's degree in mechanical engineering from the University of Iowa in 1982.

== Career ==
Ortberg started his career in 1983 as an engineer at Texas Instruments before joining Rockwell Collins in 1987 as a program manager. In 2001, he was promoted from vice president to vice president and general manager of communication systems at Rockwell Collins. He rose through the ranks at Rockwell Collins and became the president and CEO of the company in 2013. Ortberg held the position for five years until the company was acquired by United Technologies (UTC) in 2018. Ortberg stayed on to lead the merger of Rockwell Collins and UTC Aerospace Systems to form Collins Aerospace, where he was again named CEO. Ortberg would remain with the company through its merger with Raytheon in 2020 to form the RTX Corporation. He retired from RTX in 2021.

Ortberg was chair of the board of governors of the Aerospace Industries Association. He is on the board of directors of Aptiv.

On August 8, 2024, Ortberg became a member of Boeing's board of directors after becoming its president and CEO . Ortberg chose to be based in the Seattle area, where the company's main commercial aircraft assembly plants are located. Boeing spent about $300,000 to help Ortberg move to Seattle. His decision came more than two decades after Boeing leadership decided to move the company's headquarters out of Seattle. Ortberg received about $18 million for the months he was the CEO in 2024.

== Personal life ==
Ortberg married Valerie Dee Heitman on August 13, 1983. They have two daughters.
