= Future of Flight Aviation Center & Boeing Tour =

Aviation museum in Mukilteo, Washington

Boeing Future of Flight

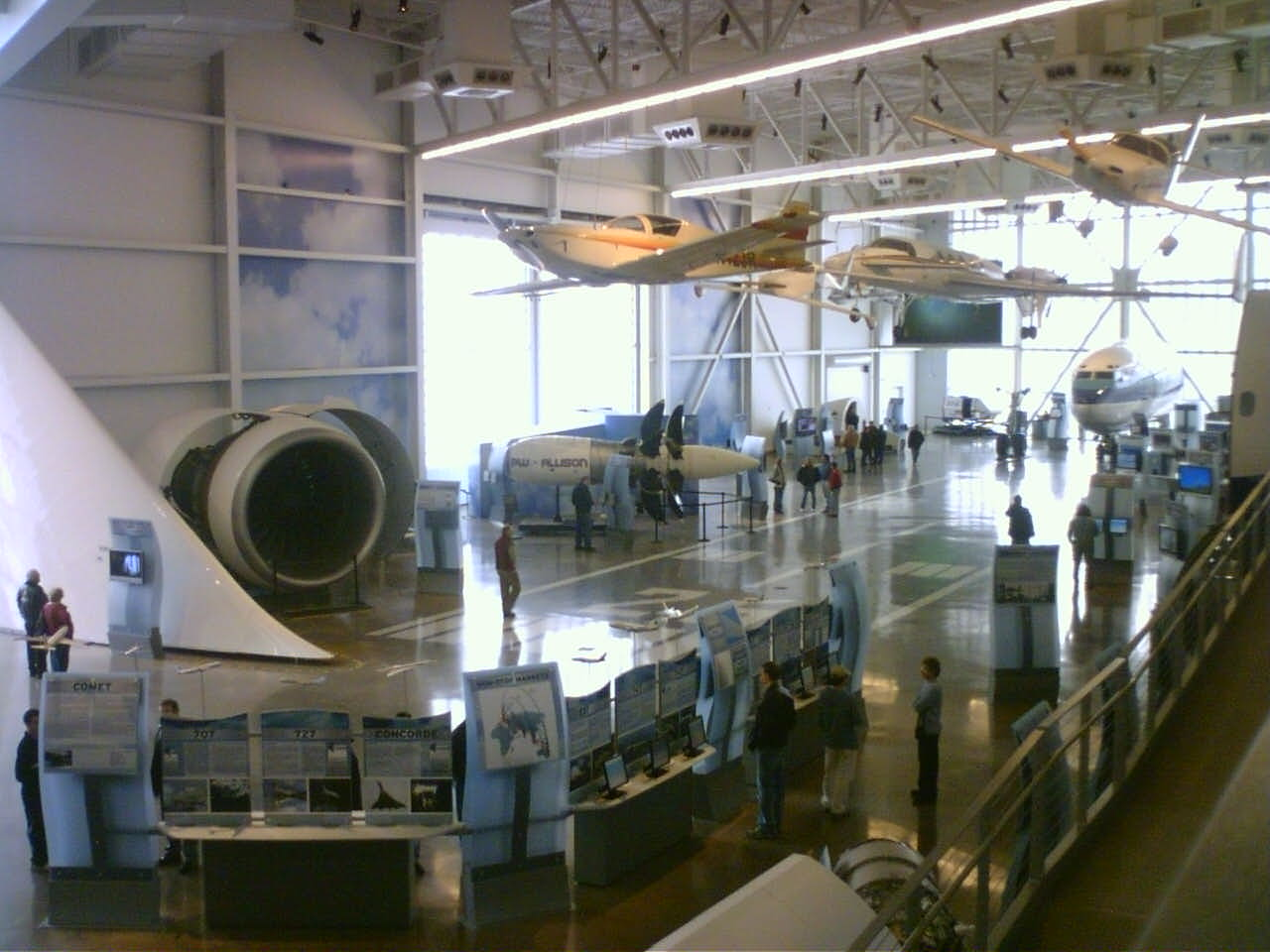
- The museum's Gallery in 2006
- Former names: Future of Flight Aviation Center & Boeing Tour (2005–2018); National Flight Interpretive Center (planning)
- Established: December 16, 2005; 20 years ago
- Location: 8415 Paine Field Boulevard; Mukilteo, Washington
- Coordinates: 47.9212°N 122.2902°W
- Type: Aviation museum
- Visitors: ~500,000 (2017)
- Architects: Freiheit and Ho; Krei Architecture
- Owner: Snohomish County
- Employees: 30+ (2017)
- Website: boeingfutureofflight.com

The Future of Flight Aviation Center, officially known as Boeing Future of Flight, is an aviation museum and education center located at the northwest corner of Paine Field in Mukilteo, Washington. It is the starting point for the Boeing Tour, a guided tour of a portion of the nearby Boeing Everett Factory in Everett, Washington. The 73,000-square-foot (6,800 m^{2}) facility, owned by Snohomish County via Paine Field and operated by Boeing, opened in 2005 at a cost of $24 million; it is funded by a sales and use tax from the county via its public facilities district. The museum includes a 28,000-square-foot (2,600 m^{2}) gallery containing static and interactive exhibits and displays as well as a 240-seat theater, café and shops.

== History ==
The facility was originally conceived in 2001 by Snohomish County in conjunction with Boeing, the Museum of Flight, and Paine Field as the National Flight Interpretive Center. While the facility was projected to open by the end of 2002 with the Museum of Flight managing it, lack of approval by the latter's board directors over funding delayed construction, which did not start until November 2004 under the supervision of Howard S. Wright Companies; a 102-room Hilton Garden Inn hotel was built alongside the facility. The initial name was intended for temporary use during the campaign for supporting and funding the museum; a lengthy naming process culminated in the county council's unanimous approval to rename the facility as the Future of Flight Aviation Center & Boeing Tour on December 9, 2004. The facility ultimately opened on December 16, 2005.

Boeing took over operation of the facility on October 12, 2018, after Snohomish County's contract with the previous operator, the Institute of Flight, expired the previous day. The Institute of Flight, formerly known as the Future of Flight Foundation, was a nonprofit organization that owned the museum's collection and engaged in worldwide education outreach; its collection was removed from the facility with Boeing's takeover. The county had previously started negotiations on June 12, 2017, with the Museum of Flight to have the latter take over the facility upon the expiration of the Institute of Flight contract, but negotiations ended in January 2018 without a deal.

== Future of Flight Aviation Center ==
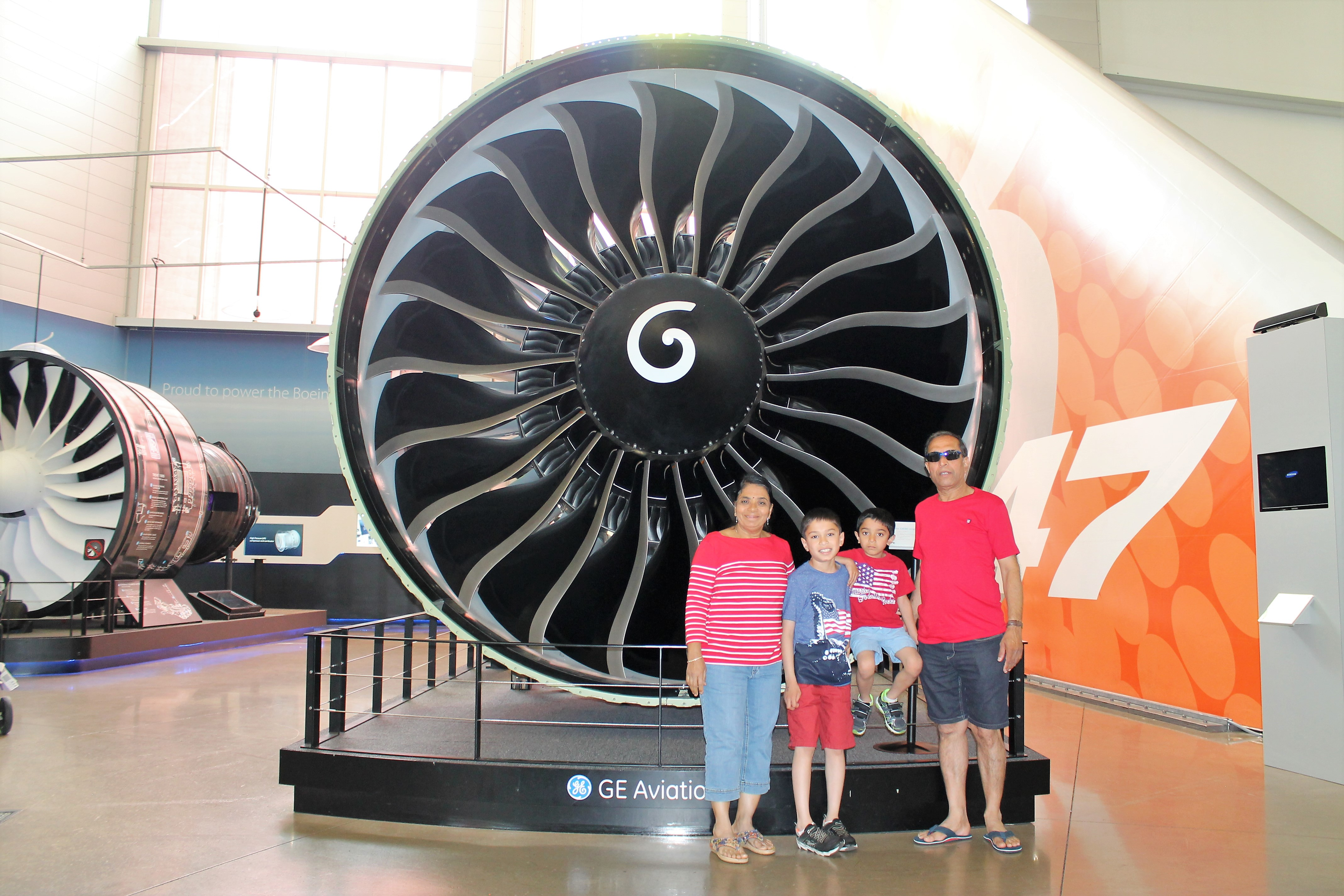
Plane Engine Size Compared to Human Size at Boeing

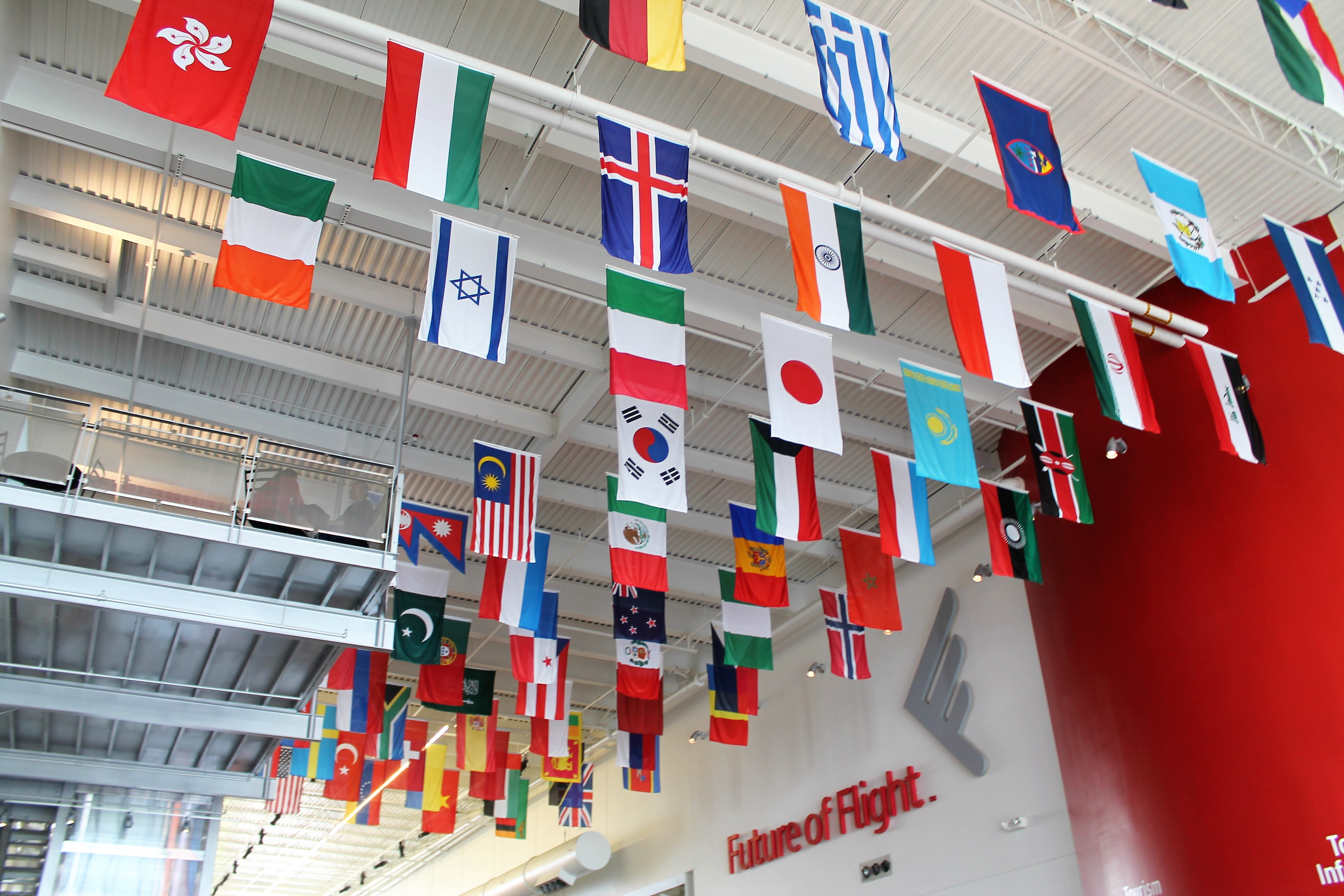
World Flags

During the Institute of Flight's oversight of the Future of Flight Aviation Center, exhibits at the facility included:

- A comparison between the Boeing 707 fuselage and the Boeing 787 fuselage.
- Videos, presentations, and mock-ups illustrating the history of the passenger experience in Boeing aircraft from the 707 to the 787.
- A genuine Boeing 727 cockpit in which visitors can sit and operate switches and controls.
- Working full-size model GE90 777 engine and Rolls-Royce Trent 1000 787 engine.
- Various full-size airplanes suspended from the exhibit area ceiling.
- Displays of jet aircraft components, including engines, landing gear, and sections of tail and fuselage from several manufacturers.
- Innovator - a virtual ride to far-away places and experiences like Egypt, the Battle for Iwo Jima and an adrenalin-charged Grand Prix race (additional charge).
- A learning area covering the inner workings of aircraft.
- Videos and information about flight decks in a variety of Boeing aircraft.
- Displays and videos on the history of jet airplanes and the airlines that have used them.
- An area for visitors to design and print their own airplane image.
- The How Planes are Made Family Zone.
- A rooftop observation deck, with views of the Boeing factory, Paine Field, and parked aircraft outside.

The gallery's aircraft and mock-up space module were loaned from the Museum of Flight. All exhibits were removed when Boeing took over the facility; Boeing subsequently dedicated a large portion of the gallery with exhibits on autonomous aircraft. Boeing also started charging for visits to the observation deck, which was previously free to visitors under the Institute of Flight.

== Boeing Tour ==
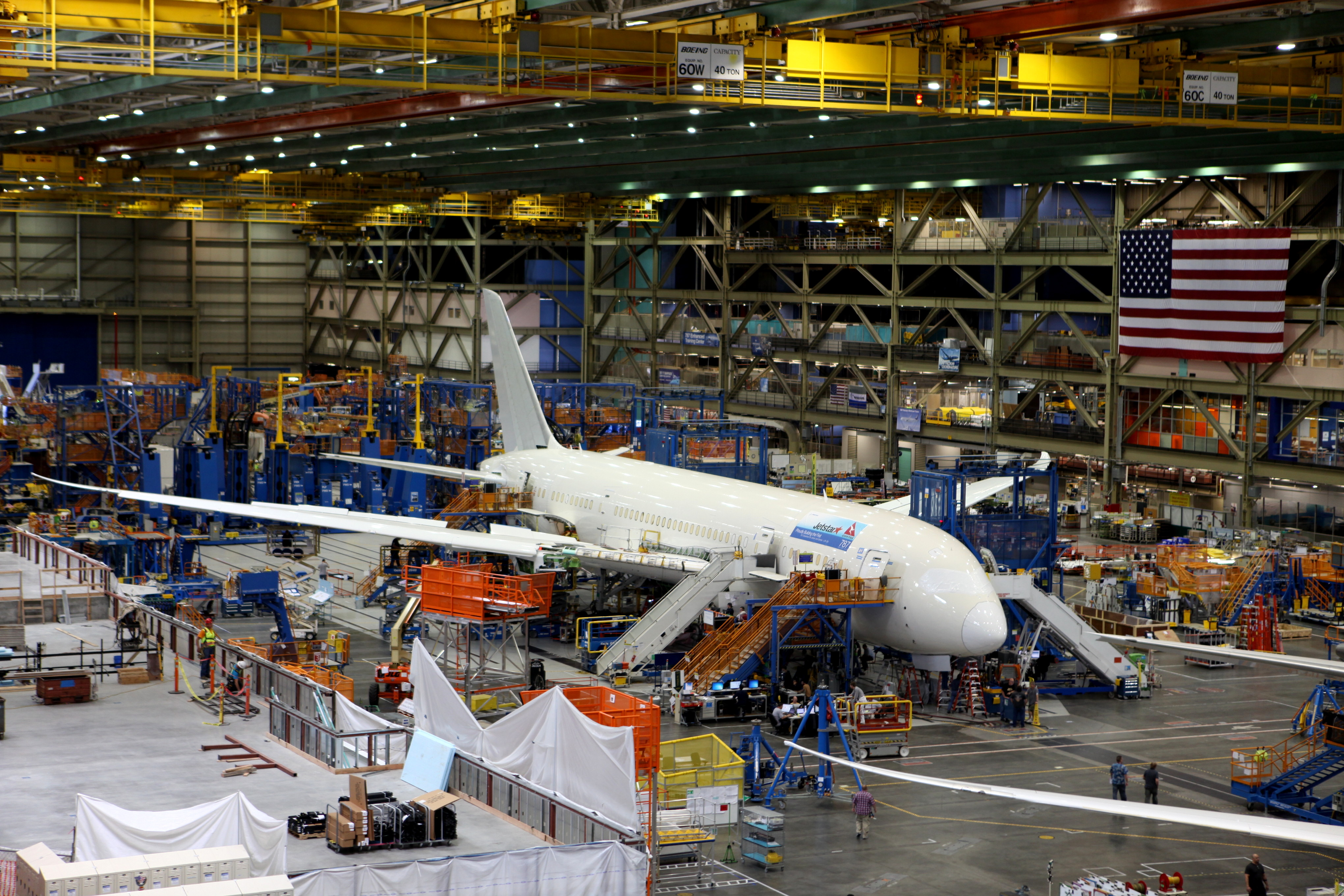
Interior of the Boeing Everett Factory, with a Jetstar Boeing 787 being built.

The Boeing Tour covers the Boeing Everett Factory, where guests can observe airplanes in all stages of construction. The factory produces the Boeing 767, 777, and 777X, as well as performing completion work on the 787. The tour also includes the main assembly building, which Guinness World Records proclaimed the largest building in the world by volume. The tour lasts approximately 80 minutes.

The former Boeing Tour Center was located next to the factory and now is abandoned, after closing in December 2005 when the Future of Flight Aviation Center opened. The tour was suspended in March 2020 due to the COVID-19 pandemic and resumed October 2023; during the reopening of the museum, it was replaced by a 45-minute documentary.

== Retail outlets ==
The Boeing Store is located at the front of the tour. It is a store that features items that relate to the Boeing Company. There is a separate Future of Flight store next to it, selling many more traditional Pacific Northwest gift shop items, including foodstuffs. The center also includes a small cafeteria across the lobby.
