= Malcolm T. Stamper =

Malcolm Stamper
- Born: Malcolm Theodore Stamper; April 4, 1925; Detroit, Michigan, U.S.
- Died: June 14, 2005 (aged 80); Seattle, Washington, U.S.

Malcolm Stamper (April 4, 1925 – June 14, 2005) was the longest serving president in Boeing's history and was best known for leading 50,000 people in the race to build the 747 jetliner.

Born and raised in Detroit, Michigan, Stamper joined Boeing in 1962 after working for General Motors. His first assignment at Boeing was to sell its ailing gas turbine division to Caterpillar. Following this success, Boeing president William M. Allen asked Stamper to spearhead production of the new 747 airplane on which the company's future depended. This was a monumental engineering and management challenge, which involved the construction of the world's biggest factory in which to build the 747 at Everett, Washington, a plant which spanned the size of roughly 53 acres.

In 1978, Stamper was one of only a dozen U.S. corporate executives to earn over a million dollars.

He served as president of the company and a member of the board of directors from 1972 until 1985, when he became vice chairman of the board. During the 1969-70 recession, Stamper presided over the layoff of nearly two-thirds of its 101,000 employees. By the late 1970s, however, the 747 was a huge success. By the time Stamper retired in 1990, Boeing seemed to face no serious threat from McDonnell Douglas or from European competitor Airbus. He predicted that the company would remain the leader in the field for the foreseeable future.

Stamper also served on boards at Nordstrom, Chrysler, Whittaker Corporation, Travelers Insurance, Pro Air, the Seattle Art Museum and the Smithsonian Institution. After retiring from Boeing, he started a children's book publishing company.

Stamper was the grandfather of Jay Stamper, an entrepreneur and unsuccessful nominee for the U.S. Senate in the 2014 South Carolina Democratic Party primary.
