= Jay Stamper =

American businessman (born 1972)

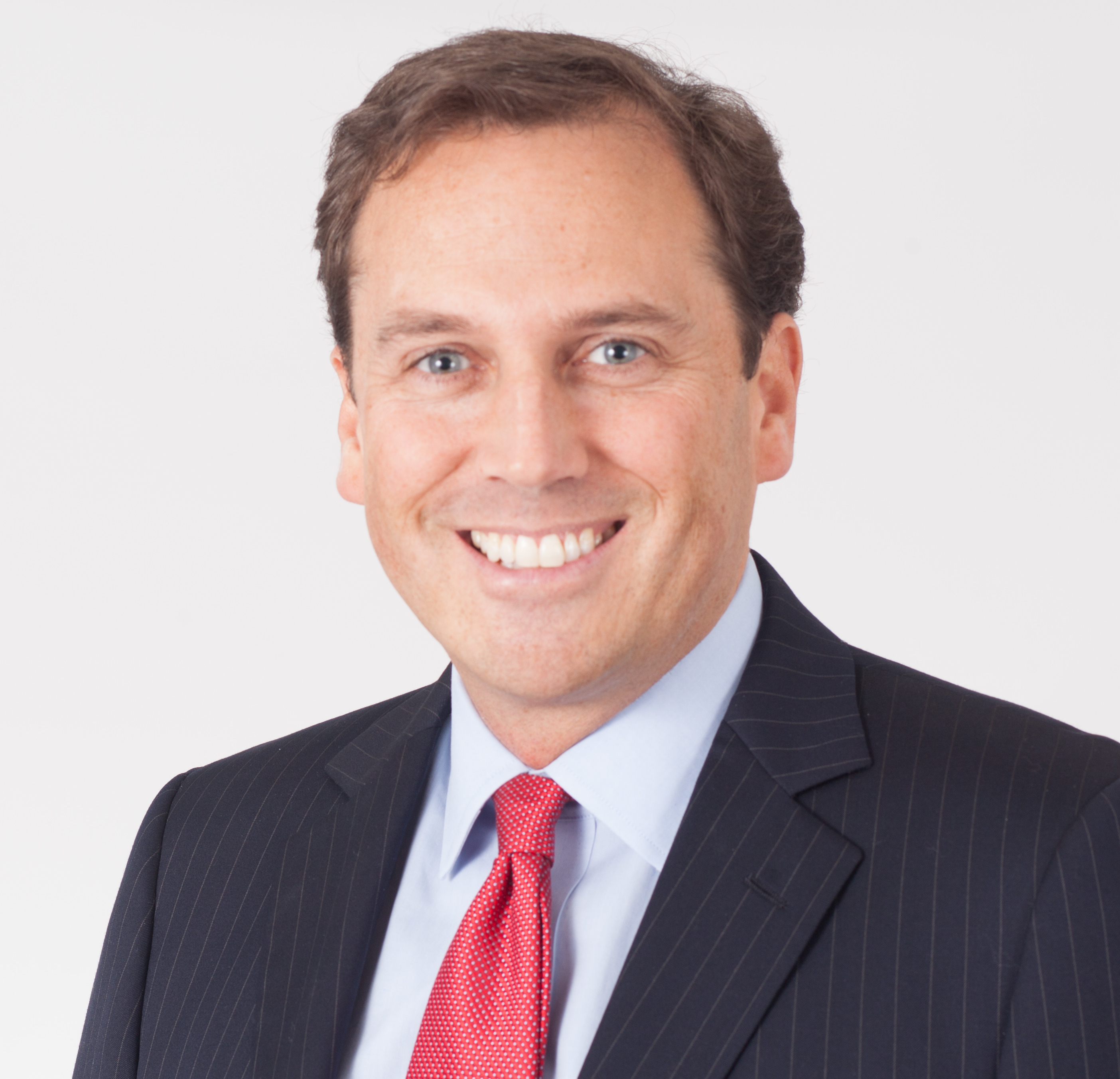

Personal details
- Born: June 14, 1972 (age 54) Spokane, Washington, U.S.
- Party: Democratic
- Education: Connecticut College (BA)

Jeremy Stamper (born June 14, 1972) is an American entrepreneur, nonprofit leader and politician from South Carolina. Stamper first gained national media attention for pranks targeting incumbent politicians and has since founded several internet companies, including Spout, The Delaware Company, Progressive Homesellers and PersonRatings.com. In February 2013, he announced his candidacy for the Democratic nomination for the 2014 United States Senate election in South Carolina.

== Early life and family ==
Stamper attended public, private and parochial schools in the Seattle area and later earned his undergraduate degree in Government from Connecticut College. Stamper is the grandson of Malcolm T. Stamper, the Boeing Company president best known for leading 50,000 people in the race to build the 747.

== Business career ==
=== The Delaware Company ===
Stamper began his entrepreneurial career in 2002 when he founded The Delaware Company, a business filing company that specialized in Delaware incorporation. He served as CEO until 2006, when he sold the company to the Dutch multinational Wolters Kluwer for an undisclosed sum.

=== Progressive Homesellers ===
In 2005, Stamper founded Progressive Homesellers. The company connected sellers with agents at brokerages who agreed to sell properties for a flat fee for people who, according to Stamper "don't need someone to baby-sit them through the process of selling a home." Progressive Homesellers was so controversial within the real estate community that it was asked to stop operating by the Washington state Department of Licensing. Progressive Homesellers was deemed by the Department of Licensing to be "procuring prospects" for real estate agents. Under Washington law, people making the initial contact with potential clients, whether through cold calling or direct mailing, have to be licensed. Stamper's promise to cut real estate commissions in half coincided with the federal anti-trust case against the National Association of Realtors.

=== Bank of America Tender Offer ===
In November 2011, Stamper's Delaware holding company, IPIC Group Ltd. made a tender offer to buy as many as 500 million Bank of America shares at $6 per share. If consummated, the offer would have been worth $3 billion and made IPIC the largest Bank of America shareholder with about 4.9% of all shares.

Bank of America recommended that its shareholders not accept the offer, even though it was made at a premium to the stock's market price.

IPIC Group eventually withdrew its offer citing Standard & Poor's downgrade of Bank of America’s credit ratings as its reason.

=== Spout ===
In April 2017, Stamper announced the release of his company's location-aware chat app, Spout. According to Stamper, "Identity-based platforms like Facebook inhibit users from posting their most authentic content, and people are still looking for an alternative. On Spout, you can be yourself and interact freely with people nearby or around the world."

=== U.S. Senate candidacy ===
On February 26, 2013, Stamper announced his candidacy for the Democratic nomination for the United States Senate seat held by Lindsey Graham. Due to his past controversies and history of pranks, it has been speculated that his candidacy is a joke, particularly given the nomination of Alvin Greene for South Carolina's other Senate seat in 2010 and the fact that he only moved to the state from Seattle in March 2013. Stamper denies this: "No. That would be the answer. I can’t imagine someone doing this as a prank. I don’t want to be one of those people who talks about how hard it is to run, but you don’t put this kind of effort into a prank. No." He credits his recent marriage for his move to South Carolina.

Stamper describes himself as an economic progressive who supports protecting the social safety net and increased taxes on the top 1% and in "interpreting the Constitution without a lot of flourishing". He supports the Violence Against Women Act and opposes interventionism, saying that "I am confident I can pick up a lot of conservatives who have a libertarian bent, with people who are upset about the NSA overreach. They are upset about the interventionism and they fall along the lines of Ron Paul or Rand Paul. I believe I can reach some of those people on the issues, even though we disagree fundamentally on a number of issues."

As of September 2013, Stamper had no campaign staff and as of April 2014 he had raised a total of $59,677, with $10,257 cash on hand.

On May 28, 2014, the South Carolina Democratic Party's executive committee voted unanimously to endorse state Sen. Brad Hutto in the primary election over Stamper. In the June 10, 2014 primary, Stamper took 23.5% of the vote.

=== Support for Bernie Sanders ===
On February 13, 2016, Stamper endorsed Bernie Sanders for the Democratic nomination for President of the United States, writing "Bernie understands that fighting wars to topple foreign regimes always has huge unintended consequences. Even after her vote to authorize the disastrous $1.7 trillion war in Iraq, Hillary still doesn’t".

== Media attention and legal issues ==
=== Internet ===
In 2002, Stamper began cybersquatting the domain names corresponding to the names of elected officials and connecting the domains to various controversial websites including sites promoting cannibalism as a form of political satire. A website for then-U.S. Representative Porter Goss, www.PorterGoss.com, directed to a website for the white supremacy organisation National Association for the Advancement of White People, the names of nine Ohio state legislators directed to sites promoting cannibalism or giving instructions for turning breast milk into cheese and the names of 12 Florida State Senators directed to a cannabis-growing website. In an interview in 2013, Stamper said: "We thought it was hilarious. And it was hilarious, to us. And to many other people. It wasn’t a serious political statement as much as it was just some guys having fun. It was the kind of stuff that college kids would do if they didn’t have a date on a Friday night."

In 2002, Stamper registered the domains ronaldlauder.com or ronaldlauder.org. Ronald Lauder filed suit against their use. The World Intellectual Property Organization ruled that two domains registered by Stamper were "not confusingly similar" to the Estée Lauder trademark and found in favor of Stamper.

In 2009, Stamper released PersonRatings.com, where users could rate and review any American on numerous qualities. On April 1, 2009, when word started going around about the site, there was some confusion about whether it was real, or just an April Fools' Day prank. Stamper described the site as "the homepage for your life-long accumulated reputation" but has admitted that "you need to take a person's ratings profile with a grain of salt".

=== Federal Savings ===
In 2006, Stamper founded Federal Savings, a finance company that sold debt securities with a maturity of six months. Between 200 and 300 people invested in "term certificates" with annual percent yields of 6.25 and 8.85 percent. The company claimed to operate under an exemption to Federal securities laws and never obtained licenses to sell securities anywhere. On March 9, 2007, the Washington State Department of Financial Institutions ordered Federal Savings and Stamper to stop selling securities. DFI accused the company of failing to register to sell securities in Washington State. In an agreement with the state in June 2007, Federal Savings did not admit or deny the facts alleged by DFI but agreed to reimburse DFI $4,500 in investigative costs. In an e-mail to the Seattle Post-Intelligencer, Stamper wrote that he "never lied about anything" or indicated that the notes were FDIC-insured, adding that he contributed $600,000 of his own money to "ensure that everyone is repaid with interest." In 2007, Federal Savings repaid all $4.7 million of principal and interest to the 219 investors who invested. Stamper himself was threatened with a life sentence and agreed to a felony plea deal, pleading guilty to three felony charges relating to the business. He was fined $10,225 and attended probation.

In July 2010 the McKay-Chadwell law firm, which represented Federal Savings in Washington State's legal claims, filed suit against Stamper and others with Federal Savings, resulting in default judgement of approximately $250,000 he owed in unpaid legal fees. Stamper and his sister Meaghan McKaige, along with her husband Andrew McKaige, contested the court decision in favor of the law firm, but lost their appeal in April 2013.
