= Legacy West =

Lifestyle center in Plano, Texas, United States

- Interactive map of Legacy West
- Address: 5905 Legacy Drive; Plano, TX 75024
- Coordinates: 33.078°N 96.825°W
- Status: Open
- Groundbreaking: 2014; 12 years ago
- Opening: June 2, 2017; 9 years ago
- Website: legacywest.com

Companies
- Architect: Gensler
- Developer: Karahan Companies; KDC; Columbus Realty Partners

Technical details
- Cost: US$2 billion
- Size: 415,000 square feet (38,555 m^{2})

Legacy West is a lifestyle center in Plano, Texas. Legacy West contains 415,000 sq ft of retail, restaurant and office space, a 55,000 sq ft food hall, over 1,300 residential units and a 303-room Renaissance Hotel. It is bordered on the south by the curving Legacy Drive and Headquarters Drive, on the north by the Sam Rayburn Tollway, on the east by the Dallas North Tollway, and on the west by the exit to Headquarters Drive from Sam Rayburn Tollway.

== Development ==
In late 2011, JCPenney issued a request for proposals to develop the 240 acres of land surrounding its regional headquarters in Plano. The surrounding property had been vacant since JCPenney purchased the land in 1987, to relocate its headquarters to Texas from New York City. In 2014, JCPenney came to an agreement with local real estate firms Karahan Companies, KDC and Columbus Realty Partners to develop the land. Construction started later that year, with the developers planning a luxury hotel tower, corporate office space, urban shopping center and apartments. When Toyota announced soon after that it would be moving its North American headquarters to the site from Torrance, California, developers pushed up the timetable for the project.

Toyota broke ground to begin construction on its new $350 million 100-acre headquarters in January 2015. The following month, developers broke ground on the first phase of Legacy West's $2 billion mixed-use project. Construction continued over the next two years on corporate offices, residential, retail, and restaurant properties. On June 2, 2017, Legacy West officially opened the shopping district to the public. Secretary of State of Texas Rolando Pablos, Plano Mayor Harry LaRosiliere and developer Fehmi Karahan helped cut the ceremonial ribbon for the grand opening.

In late 2017 construction continued on projects anchoring the northern end of the retail and entertainment district, including Legacy Hall, a three-story food hall that will have more than two-dozen stalls featuring food concepts from restaurateurs including Dallas-based chef John Tesar and Chili's founder Larry Lavine. Legacy Hall will also house a brewery and tap room from Unlawful Assembly Brewing Company. In 2017, Fogo de Chão opened a location in the hall.

== Shops, hotel and tenants ==
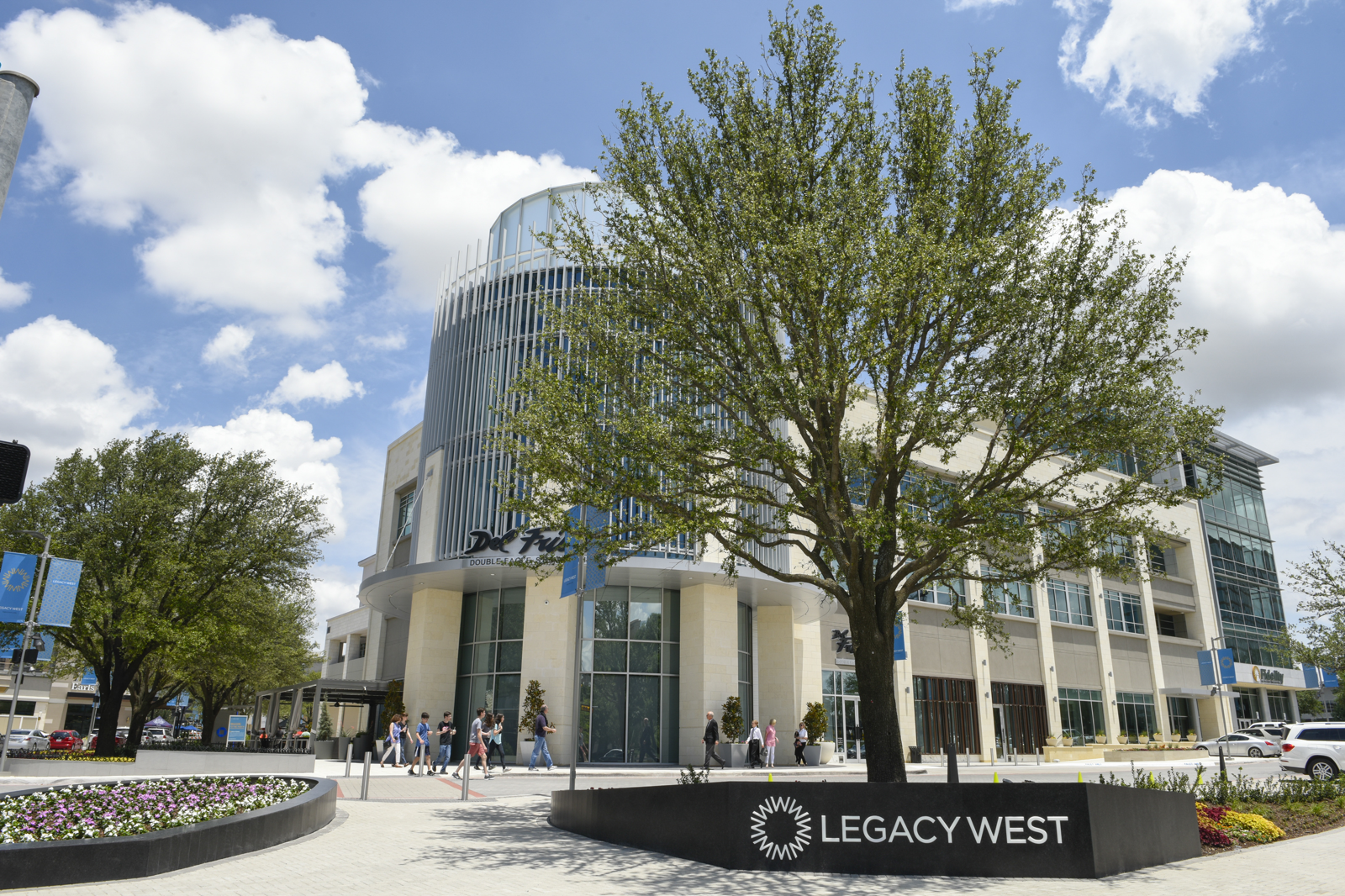
Legacy West at the entry to Windrose Avenue, June 2017.

All of the restaurants and retailers are located on tree-lined Windrose Avenue, which spans from Sam Rayburn Tollway to Legacy Drive, where it ends at the Beal Bank corporate office. There is a Barnes & Noble concept store with a restaurant serving wine and beer. At the center of the development is a 3,500 square-foot Bellagio-inspired fountain where choreographed water, light and music shows take place.

Legacy West is home to the headquarters of JCPenney, FedEx Office, NTT Data Systems, and Boeing Global Services, and the North American headquarters for Toyota Motor Corporation. It is home to the regional headquarters for JPMorgan Chase, and Liberty Mutual Insurance. Renaissance Hotels operate the 15-story, 303-room Renaissance Dallas at Plano Legacy West Hotel.

== The Shops at Legacy ==
To the east of Legacy West and Dallas North Tollway is the Shops at Legacy (now designated as the Shops at Legacy East and Legacy North), a 400,000 square foot lifestyle center. It is located south of the office building of Bread Financial. The Shops at Legacy houses Hilti North America, Hilti's North American headquarters. Right in the center of The Shops at Legacy is the Baccus Cemetery, the oldest cemetery in Plano dating back to about 1847 where Captain Henry Cook buried his son Daniel Cook, a veteran from the War of 1812. The Baccus Cemetery is one of the most historic sites in Plano.

== See also ==
- Plano, Texas
- List of shopping malls in Texas
