= PersonRatings.com =

PersonRatings.com was a website where users could rate and review individuals, regardless of profession. The site allowed users to read about and rate others on a range of qualities, including trustworthiness. The site purported to be a "Yelp about people". Anyone was free to log on and contribute their opinion. The site's claim that volunteers will weed out extremes of opinion, resulting in an accurate description of the person concerned was met with skepticism. Individuals were rated on a five-star scale – from "Not At All" to "Extremely". PersonRatings' founder Jay Stamper has described the site as "the homepage for your lifelong accumulated reputation." PersonRatings was owned by Seattle-based Topic5 LLC. The website is no longer active, and as of December 9th 2022 the domain name is available for purchase.
