= Boeing Store =

Aviation Store

The Boeing Store
- Type: Private company
- Industry: Retail
- Founded: 2001, Chicago, Illinois
- Headquarters: Chicago, Illinois
- Key people: Dennis Muilenburg, CEO of Boeing Co.
- Products: Boeing merchandise
- Parent: Boeing
- Website: www.boeingstore.com

The Boeing Store is a chain of stores that sells official Boeing merchandise. It is based in Seattle, Washington and is owned and operated by the Boeing Company. There are 4 stores across the United States and an international online store.

== History ==
From the 1940s to the 1960s, Boeing operated company stores that resembled convenience stores, selling aspirin, magazines, and a small selection of logo souvenirs. The Boeing Stores, Inc. (BSI) was officially founded on July 1, 2001. The same year, a wholesale department added; one of the earliest and most consistent resellers of Boeing merchandise is The Museum of Flight, located in Seattle on Boeing Field. In 2006, Future of Flight opened, including BSI's flagship store, in Everett, WA. Two years later, the Custom Sales Department established. The Boeing Stores Custom Sales Team supports Boeing with merchandise and branding, offering promotional products, apparel, executive gifting, and project management support.

The three largest recognition programs (Pride@Boeing, Instant Recognition, and Service Awards) moved under BSI in January 2011. In 2013, the Custom Hangar products were introduced for the first time. The first products launched were commercial jetliner windows, which sold out immediately. By the beginning of 2015, Custom Hangar included more than 150 different products including apparel, wall art, desktop pieces, and furniture. The Boeing centennial anniversary is July 15, 2016, with celebrations in the Puget Sound and across the globe

== Locations ==
The Boeing Store has 7 stores around the United States and a national traveling store.

Location (Store #)	Building	City	Open to the public?
Miami	6601 NW 36th St.	Miami, FL	✓ Yes
St. Louis	325 James S McDonnell Blvd, Bldg 300 Lobby	Hazelwood, Missouri	✓ Yes
Charleston	Bldg 88-21	North Charleston, SC	✗ No
Oklahoma City	Bldg 84-133	Oklahoma City, OK	✗ No
Everett Factory	Bldg 40-22	Everett, Washington	✗ No
Future of Flight Aviation Center & Boeing Tour	8415 Paine Field Blvd	Mukilteo, Washington	✓ Yes
Everett Delivery Center	Bldg 45-11	Everett, Washington	✗ No
