= Boeing =

American aerospace and defense corporation

The Boeing Company
- Logo used since 1997 (Note: Wordmark used since 1948.)

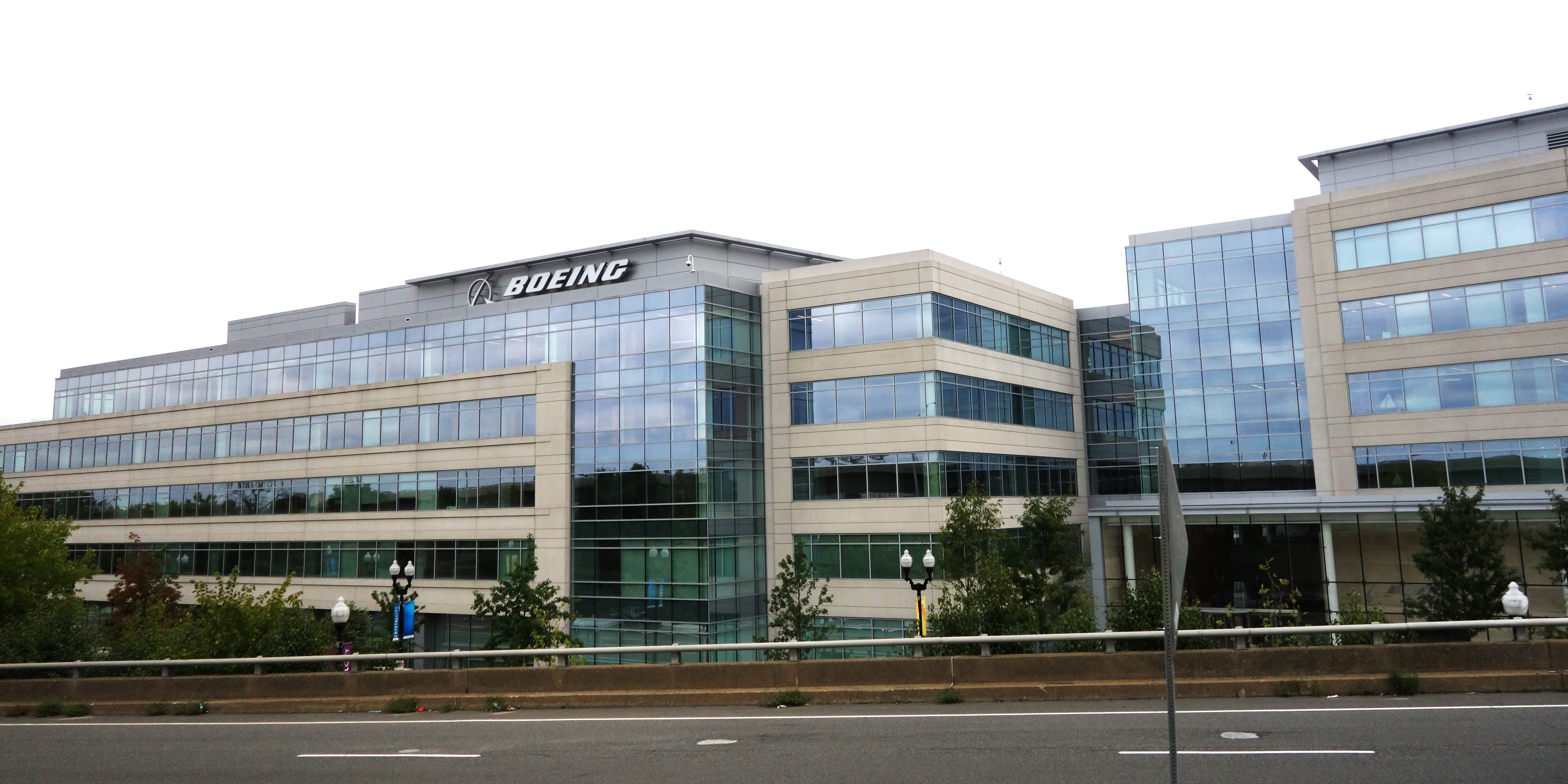
- Headquarters in Crystal City, Virginia
- Formerly: Pacific Aero Products Co. (1916‍–‍1917); Boeing Airplane Company (1917‍–‍1961)
- Type: Public
- Traded as: NYSE: BA; DJIA component; S&P 100 component; S&P 500 component
- Industry: Aerospace
- Founded: July 15, 1916; 110 years ago, in Seattle
- Founder: William E. Boeing
- Headquarters: Crystal City, Virginia, U.S.
- Area served: Worldwide
- Key people: Kelly Ortberg (president and CEO); Steve Mollenkopf (chair)
- Production output: ▲600 commercial aircraft; ▲127 military aircraft; ▲4 satellites (2025)
- Revenue: ▲US$89.5 billion (2025)
- Operating income: ▲US$4.28 billion (2025)
- Net income: ▲US$2.24 billion (2025)
- Total assets: ▲US$168.2 billion (2025)
- Total equity: ▲US$5.45 billion (2025)
- Number of employees: ▲182,000 (2025)
- Divisions: Commercial Airplanes; Defense, Space & Security; Global Services
- Subsidiaries: Aurora Flight Sciences; Boeing Australia; Boeing Canada; Boeing UK; Insitu; Jeppesen; Spectrolab; Spirit AeroSystems; Wisk Aero
- Website: boeing.com
- Footnotes; Financials as of December 31, 2025; References

The Boeing Company (/ˈboʊɪŋ/ BO-ing) is an American multinational corporation that designs and manufactures airplanes, rotorcraft, rockets, satellites, and missiles worldwide. The company also provides leasing and product support services. Boeing is among the largest global aerospace manufacturers; it is the fourth-largest defense contractor in the world based on 2022 revenue and is the largest exporter in the United States by dollar value. Boeing was founded in 1916 by William E. Boeing in Seattle, Washington. The present corporation is the result of the Boeing acquisition of McDonnell Douglas on August 1, 1997.

The Boeing Company's corporate headquarters is located in the Crystal City neighborhood of Arlington County, Virginia, near Washington, DC. The company is organized into three primary divisions: Boeing Commercial Airplanes (BCA), Boeing Defense, Space & Security (BDS), and Boeing Global Services (BGS). In 2021, Boeing recorded $62.3 billion in sales. Boeing is ranked 54th on the Fortune 500 list (2020), and ranked 121st on the Fortune Global 500 list (2020).

== History ==
=== Origins ===
The Boeing Company started in 1916, when American lumber industrialist William E. Boeing founded Pacific Aero Products Company in Seattle, Washington. Shortly before doing so, he and Conrad Westervelt created the "B&W" seaplane. In 1917, the organization was renamed Boeing Airplane Company, with William Boeing forming Boeing Airplane & Transport Corporation in 1928. In 1929, the company was renamed United Aircraft and Transport Corporation, followed by the acquisition of several aircraft makers such as Avion, Chance Vought, Sikorsky Aviation, Stearman Aircraft, Pratt & Whitney, and Hamilton Metalplane.

In 1931, the group merged its four smaller airlines into United Airlines. In 1934, aircraft manufacturing was required to be separate from air transportation. Therefore, Boeing Airplane Company became one of three major groups to arise from the dissolution of United Aircraft and Transport; the other two entities were United Aircraft (later United Technologies) and United Airlines.

In 1960, the company bought Vertol Aircraft Corporation, which at the time, was the biggest independent manufacturer of helicopters. During the 1960s and 1970s, the company diversified into industries such as outer space travel, marine craft, agriculture, energy production and transit systems.

=== Sea Launch ===
In 1995, Boeing partnered with Russian, Ukrainian, and Anglo-Norwegian organizations to create Sea Launch, a company providing commercial launch services sending satellites to geostationary orbit from floating platforms. In 2000, Boeing acquired the satellite segment of Hughes Electronics.

=== Merger with McDonnell Douglas ===
In December 1996, Boeing announced its intention to merge with McDonnell Douglas, which, following regulatory approval, was completed on August 1, 1997. The delay was caused by objections from the European Commission, which ultimately placed three conditions on the merger: exclusivity agreements with three US airlines would be terminated, separate accounts would be maintained for the McDonnell-Douglas civil aircraft business, and some defense patents were to be made available to competitors. In 2020, Quartz reported that after the merger there was a "clash of corporate cultures, where Boeing's engineers and McDonnell Douglas's bean-counters went head-to-head", which the latter won, and that this may have contributed to the events leading up to the 737 MAX crash crisis.

=== Corporate headquarters moves ===
Boeing's corporate headquarters moved from Seattle to Chicago in 2001. In 2018, the company opened its first factory in Europe at Sheffield, United Kingdom, reinforced by a research partnership with the University of Sheffield.

In May 2020, the company cut over 12,000 jobs due to the drop in air travel during the COVID-19 pandemic with plans for a total 10% cut of its workforce or approximately 16,000 positions. In July 2020, Boeing reported a loss of $2.4 billion as a result of the pandemic and the Boeing 737 MAX groundings, and that it was in response planning to make more job and production cuts. On August 18, 2020, CEO Dave Calhoun announced further job cuts; on October 28, 2020, nearly 30,000 employees were laid off, as the airplane manufacturer was increasingly losing money due to the COVID-19 pandemic.

In May 2022, Boeing announced plans to transfer its global headquarters from Chicago to Arlington, Virginia, a suburb of Washington, D.C. The company said that this decision was made in part to concentrate on its defense work with "proximity to our customers and stakeholders". After the January 2024 Alaska Airlines Flight 1282 and other incidents, one shareholder proposed relocating the corporate headquarters back to the Seattle area in hopes of getting engineering and quality control teams on-site access to key decision-makers. Boeing's board soundly dismissed the attempt.

In February 2023, Boeing announced plans for laying off approximately 2,000 of its workers from finances and human resources.

In May 2023, Boeing acquired autonomous eVTOL air taxi startup Wisk Aero.

=== Spirit Aerosystems acquisition ===
In June 2024, Boeing agreed to re-acquire Spirit AeroSystems, its longtime supplier of airplane parts, which had been established in 2005 when Boeing spun-off its Wichita division to an investment firm. The deal was initially discussed in March of the same year before being closed on June 30 at $4.7 billion.

In December 2025, Boeing was asked by the Federal Trade Commission to divest Spirit assets to resolve antitrust concerns, including the businesses that supply Airbus and Malaysian aerospace company Subang. The FTC said Airbus and Subang would buy those respective businesses. EU regulators said this proposed remedy fully addressed their concerns.

=== Labor strike ===
On September 12, 2024, a vote was held among Boeing machinist workers who are also members of the International Association of Machinists and Aerospace Workers (IAM) labor union, with 94.6% of participating members rejected a contract offer that the union's bargaining committee had endorsed, with 96% voting to strike. At 12:01 am on September 13, Boeing workers went on strike for the first time since 2008.

On October 12, 2024, the company announced plans to cut 17,000 jobs, about 10% of its global workforce, "to align with our financial reality". It would also delay the first deliveries of its 777X airliner by a year and recorded $5 billion in losses in the third quarter of the year. On October 28, Boeing initiated a significant share sale, valued at nearly $19 billion, to address cash-flow issues and avoid a potential downgrade to junk status.

On November 1, 2024, the IAM endorsed an improved contract offer which would see a 38% pay rise over four years, a $12,000 ratification bonus, and the reinstatement of an annual bonus scheme. On November 5, 2024, Boeing workers accepted the pay deal, ending a seven-week-long walk out.

=== Latest history ===
On May 20, 2026, it was announced that China will purchase 200 planes from Boeing following a bilateral meeting between China and the United States. Boeing's chief executive, Kelly Ortberg, said: "We [Boeing] had a very successful trip to China... this included an initial commitment for 200 aircraft."

== Divisions ==
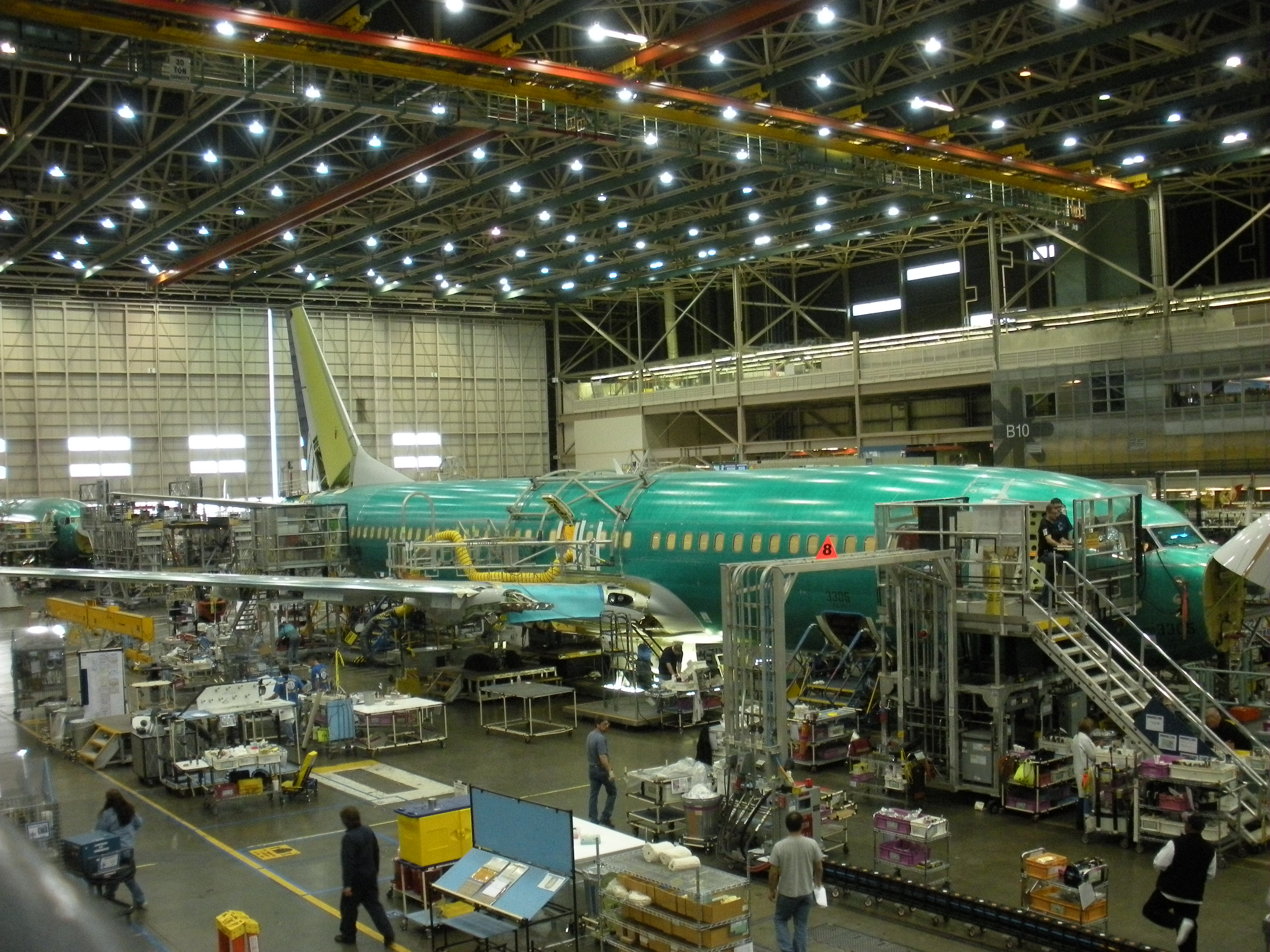
Assembly of a 737 in the Boeing Renton Factory

The company's three divisions are Commercial Airplanes; Defense, Space & Security; and Global Services.

- Boeing Commercial Airplanes (BCA) builds commercial aircraft including the 737, 767, 777, and 787 along with freighter and business jet variants of most. The division employs nearly 35,000 people, many working at the company's manufacturing facilities in Everett and Renton, Washington (outside of Seattle), and South Carolina.
- Boeing Defense, Space & Security (BDS) builds military airplanes, rotorcraft, and missiles, as well as space systems for both commercial and military customers, including satellites, spacecraft, and rockets.
- Boeing Global Services (BGS) provides aftermarket support, such as maintenance and upgrades, to customers who purchase equipment from BCA, BDS, or other manufacturers.

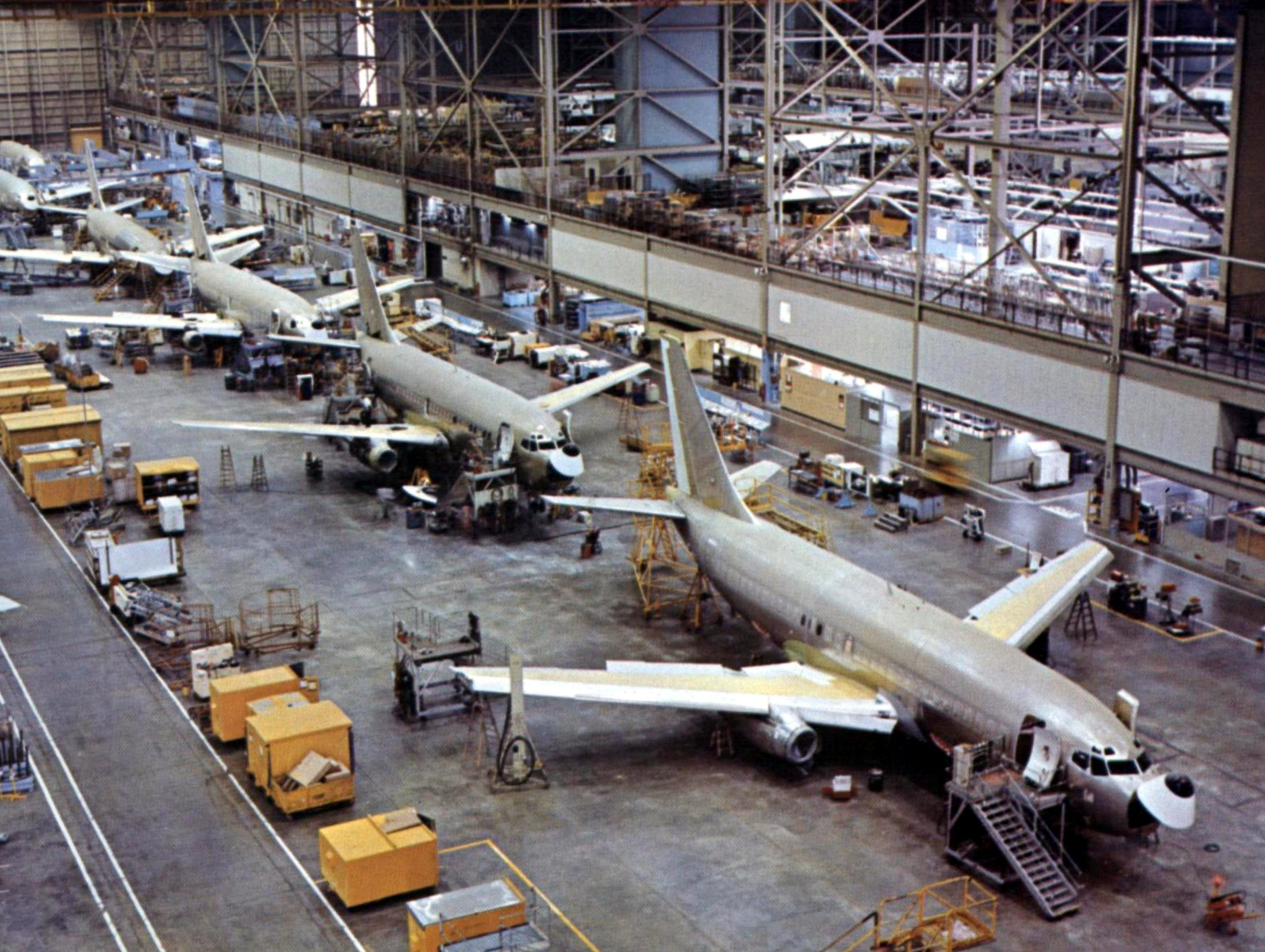
Final assembly of a Boeing 737 airplane, 1975

== Safety defects and airplane crashes ==
=== Boeing 737 MAX crashes and groundings ===
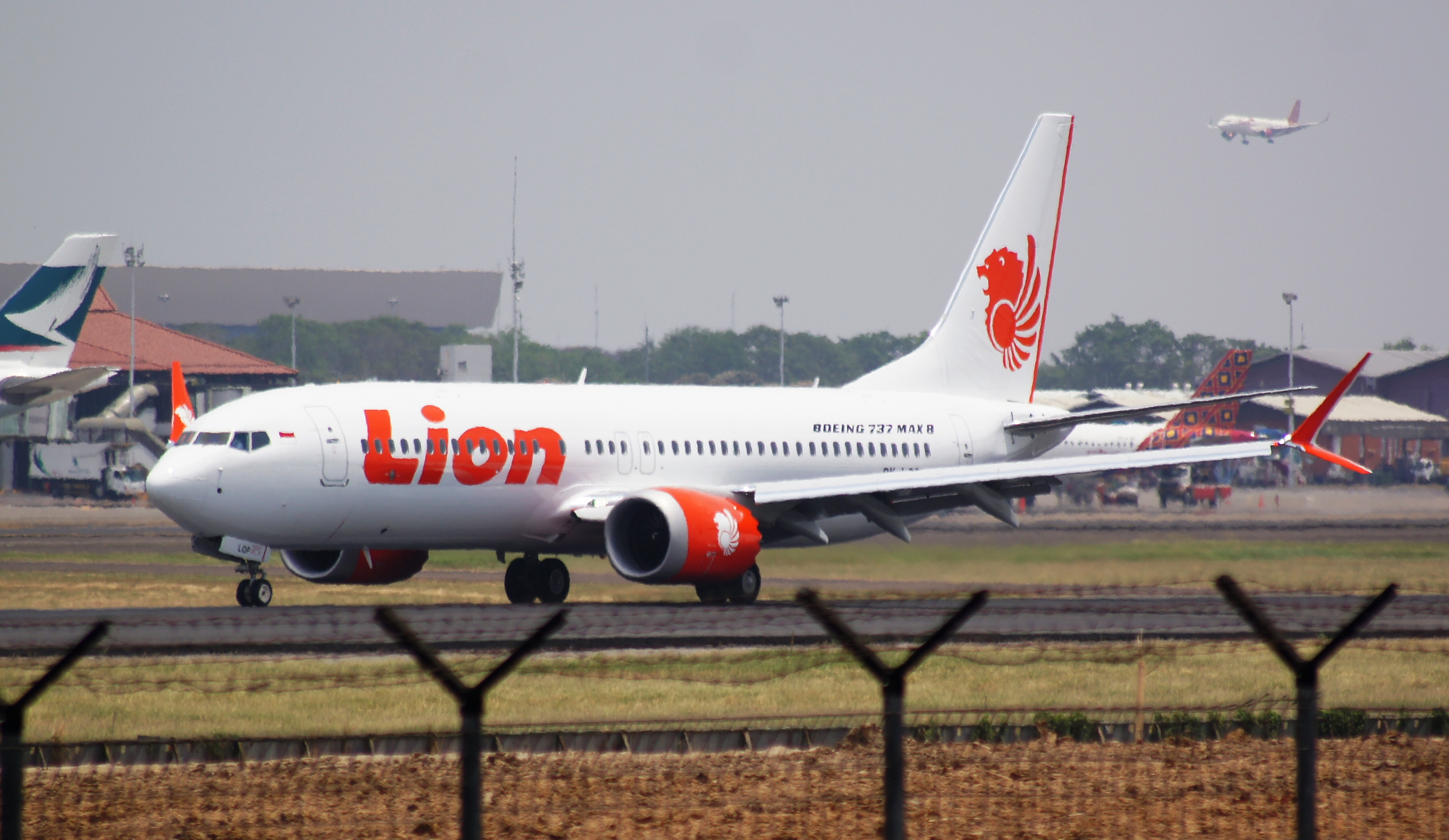
PK-LQP, the Lion Air aircraft involved

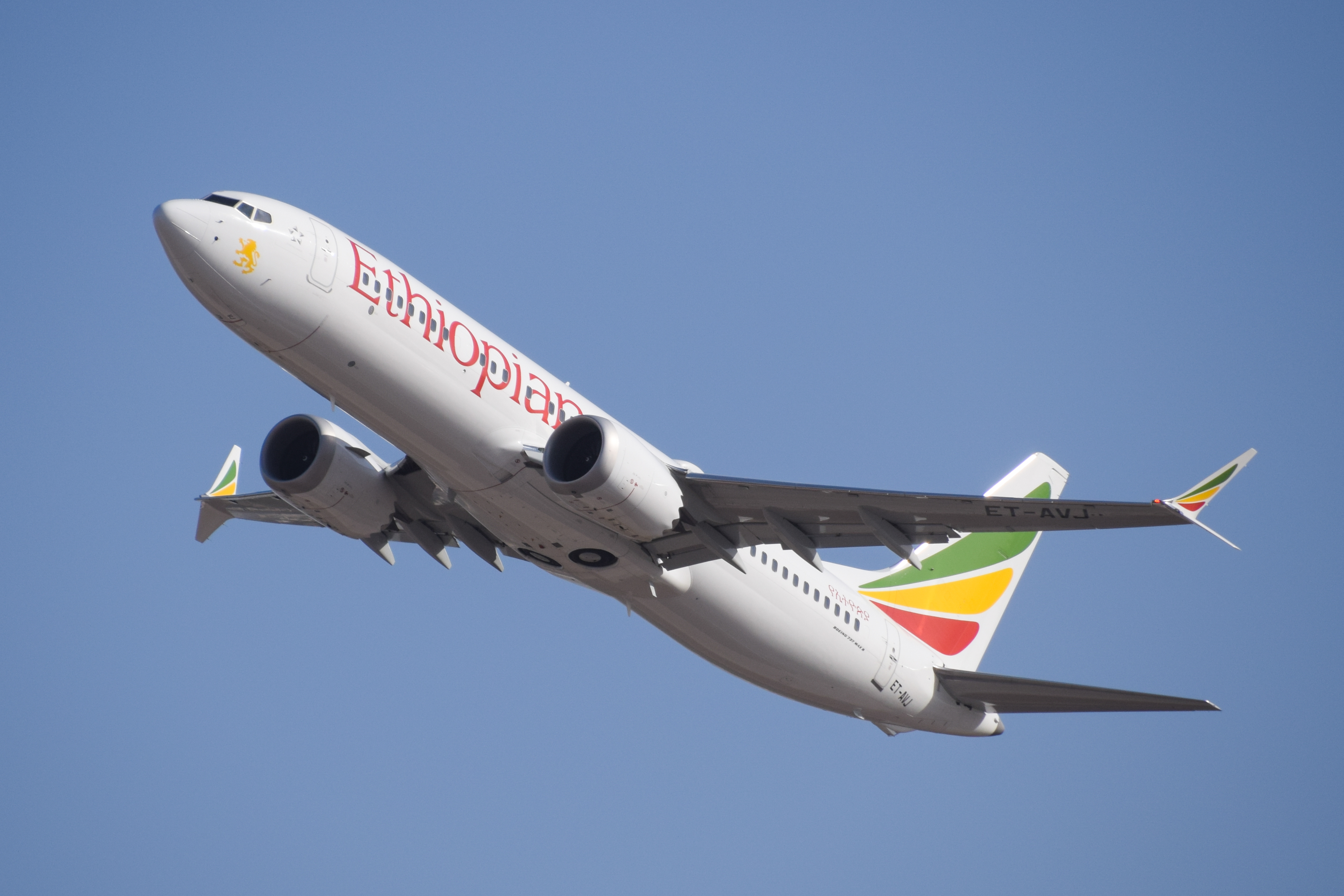
ET-AVJ, the Ethiopian Airlines aircraft involved

In 2018 and 2019, two Boeing 737 MAX narrow-body passenger airplanes crashed, leaving 346 people dead and no survivors. In response, aviation regulators and airlines around the world grounded all 737 MAX airliners. A total of 387 aircraft were grounded. Boeing's reputation, business, and financial rating suffered after the groundings, as Boeing's strategy, governance, and focus on profits and cost efficiency were questioned. In 2022, Netflix released an exposé, Downfall: The Case Against Boeing, claiming Boeing's corporate merger with McDonnell Douglas led to the crashes through a disintegration of workplace morale.

In June 2020, the Federal Aviation Administration found several 737 MAX defects that Boeing deferred to fix, in violation of regulations. In September 2020, the U.S. House of Representatives concluded its own investigation and cited numerous instances where Boeing dismissed employee concerns with a 737 MAX flight stabilizing feature (MCAS) that caused the two fatal accidents, prioritized deadline and budget constraints over safety, and lacked transparency in disclosing essential information to the FAA. It further found that the assumption that simulator training would not be necessary had "diminished safety, minimized the value of pilot training, and inhibited technical design improvements". On January 7, 2021, Boeing settled to pay over $2.5 billion after being charged with fraud over the company's hiding of information from the safety regulators: a criminal monetary penalty of $243.6 million, $1.77 billion of damages to airline customers, and a $500 million crash-victim beneficiaries fund.

In September 2022, Boeing was ordered to pay a further $200 million over charges of misleading investors about safety issues related to these crashes. In March 2023, Boeing disputed in court filings that the victims of Ethiopian Airlines Flight 302 (2019 crash) experienced any pain and suffering in the final six minutes as the plane was nosediving into the ground, arguing that death at an impact at the "speed of sound" would have been too quick to be painful. Boeing's claim was described as "preposterous" by HuffPost:

Passengers aboard the plane, the plaintiffs argued in court, "undeniably suffered horrific emotional distress, pain and suffering, and physical impact/injury while they endured extreme G-forces, braced for impact, knew the airplane was malfunctioning, and ultimately plummeted nose-down to the ground at terrifying speed".

While the investigations into the crashes of the 737 MAX were proceeding, the Boeing 777X, the company's largest capacity twin jet and the largest ever built, made its maiden flight on January 25, 2020, but also experienced problems. Following an incident during flight testing in 2021, the estimated first delivery of the aircraft was delayed until 2024. After further technical problems were discovered in the aircraft in 2022, the release was delayed again until 2025, six years after the original date.

=== Alaska Airlines Flight 1282 ===
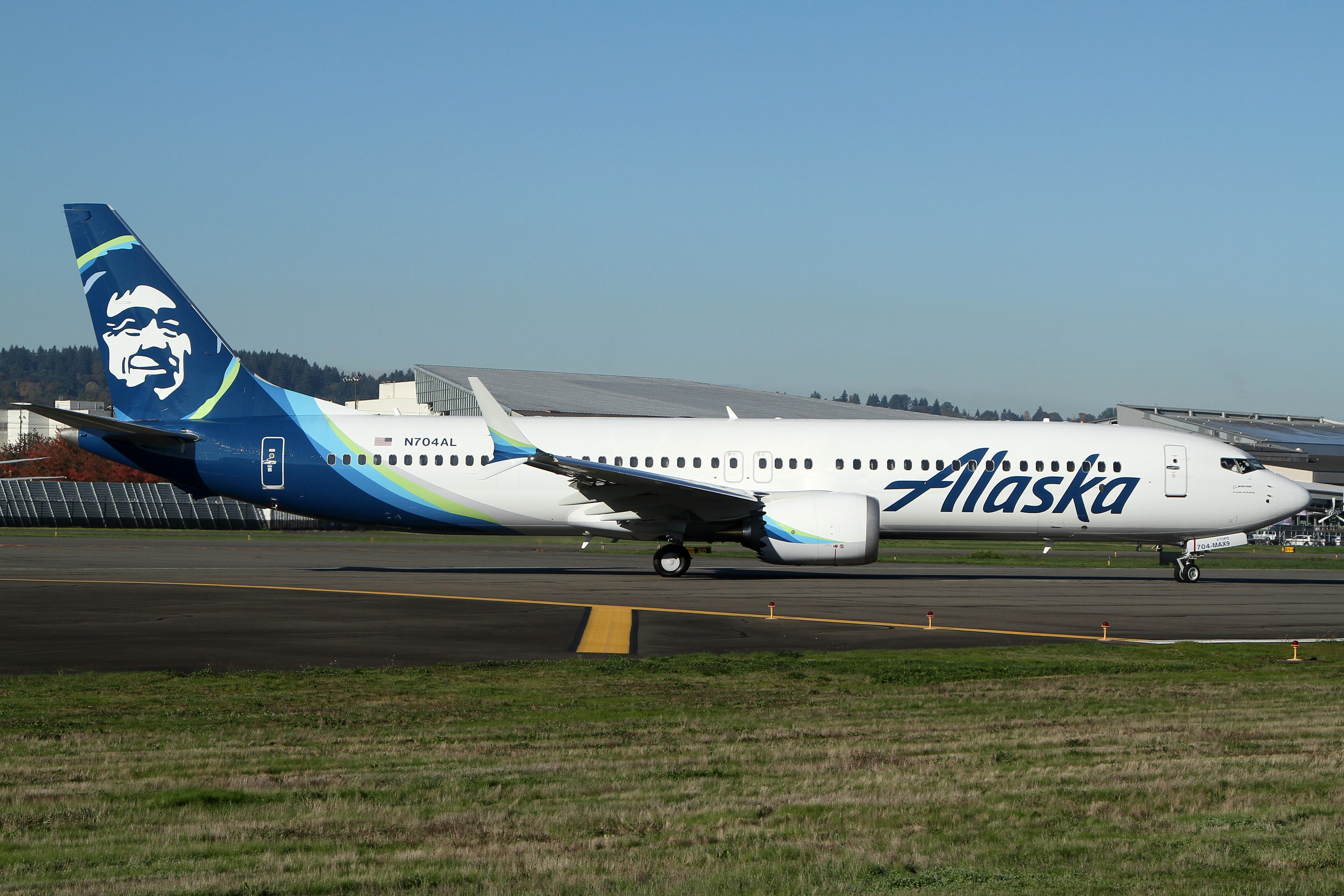
N704AL, the Alaska Airlines aircraft involved

On January 5, 2024, on Alaska Airlines Flight 1282, a door plug blowout occurred on a 737 MAX 9 jetliner after the plane had reached just over 16,000 feet, leaving a door-sized hole in the fuselage and the aircraft made an emergency landing at Portland International Airport successfully with several people on board injured, although all had subsequently been "medically cleared". The FAA mandated immediate inspections of all 737 MAX 9s fitted with door plugs, thereby grounding 171 aircraft. United Airlines found loose bolts on jets grounded by the FAA, raising questions about possible systemic problems with the Boeing 737 MAX 9. The FAA announced on January 12 that it was expanding its scrutiny of Boeing, with a production audit of the 737 MAX 9. On February 6, the National Transportation Safety Board released a preliminary report indicating that four bolts used to secure the panel had been removed, and appeared not to have been replaced, at Boeing's factory in Renton, Washington.

In March 2024, the Justice Department opened a criminal investigation into the Alaska Airlines blowout. In March 2024, CEO Dave Calhoun and board chairman Larry Kellner both announced they would be stepping down from their positions.

=== Potential replacement for the 737 MAX ===
In September 2025, The Wall Street Journal reported Boeing was planning a new single-aisle airplane to succeed the 737 MAX in an effort to recover market share lost to Airbus as a result of safety and quality issues.

== Environmental record ==
In 2006, the UCLA Center for Environmental Risk Reduction released a study showing that Boeing's Santa Susana Field Laboratory, a site that was a former Rocketdyne test and development site in the Simi Hills of eastern Ventura County in Southern California, had been contaminated by Rocketdyne with toxic and radioactive waste. Boeing agreed to a cleanup agreement with the EPA in 2017. Clean-up studies and lawsuits are in progress.

Boeing reported that each one of the jets it delivered in 2020 will add an average of one million tons of carbon dioxide to the Earth's atmosphere. It was also estimated that the planes sold in 2020 will produce about 158 million tonnes of CO2.

Climate change is impacting Boeing in the form of increased risks associated with extreme weather events, supply chain disruptions, and tough climate regulations. Boeing is forced to deal with increased operational and financial pressures associated with reducing carbon emissions and finding sustainable solutions. As such, Boeing is committed to making sustainable aviation fuel solutions suitable for its entire fleet of planes by 2030 and aims to achieve net-zero carbon emissions by 2050.

On July 19, 2022, Boeing announced a renewed partnership with Mitsubishi to produce carbon-neutral and sustainable solutions.

=== Jet biofuels ===
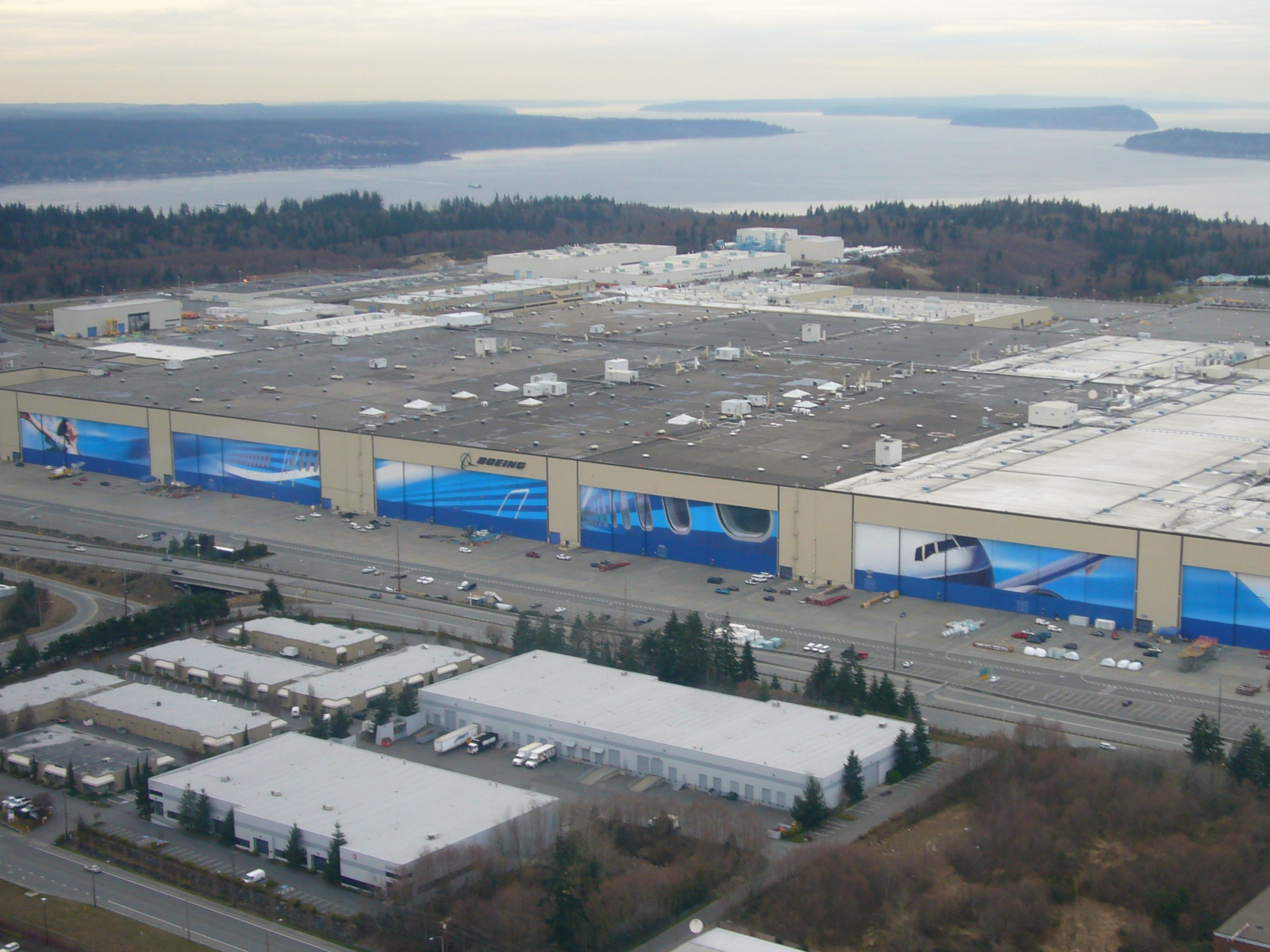
Boeing Everett Factory, the assembly facility for most of the company's wide-body aircraft

The airline industry is responsible for about 11% of greenhouse gases emitted by the U.S. transportation sector. Aviation's share of the greenhouse gas emissions was poised to grow, as air travel increases and ground vehicles use more alternative fuels like ethanol and biodiesel. Boeing estimates that biofuels could reduce flight-related greenhouse-gas emissions by 60 to 80%. The solution blends algae fuels with existing jet fuel.

Boeing executives said the company was collaborating with Brazilian biofuels maker Tecbio, Aquaflow Bionomic of New Zealand, and other fuel developers around the world. As of 2007, Boeing had tested six fuels from these companies, and expected to test 20 fuels "by the time we're done evaluating them". Boeing also joined other aviation-related members in the Algal Biomass Organization (ABO) in June 2008.

Air New Zealand and Boeing are researching the jatropha plant to see if it is a sustainable alternative to conventional fuel. A two-hour test flight using a 50–50 mixture of the new biofuel with Jet A-1 in a Rolls-Royce RB-211 engine of a 747–400 was completed on December 30, 2008. The engine was then removed to be studied to identify any differences between the Jatropha blend and regular Jet A1. No effects on performances were found.

== Political contributions, federal contracts, advocacy, criticism, sanctions ==
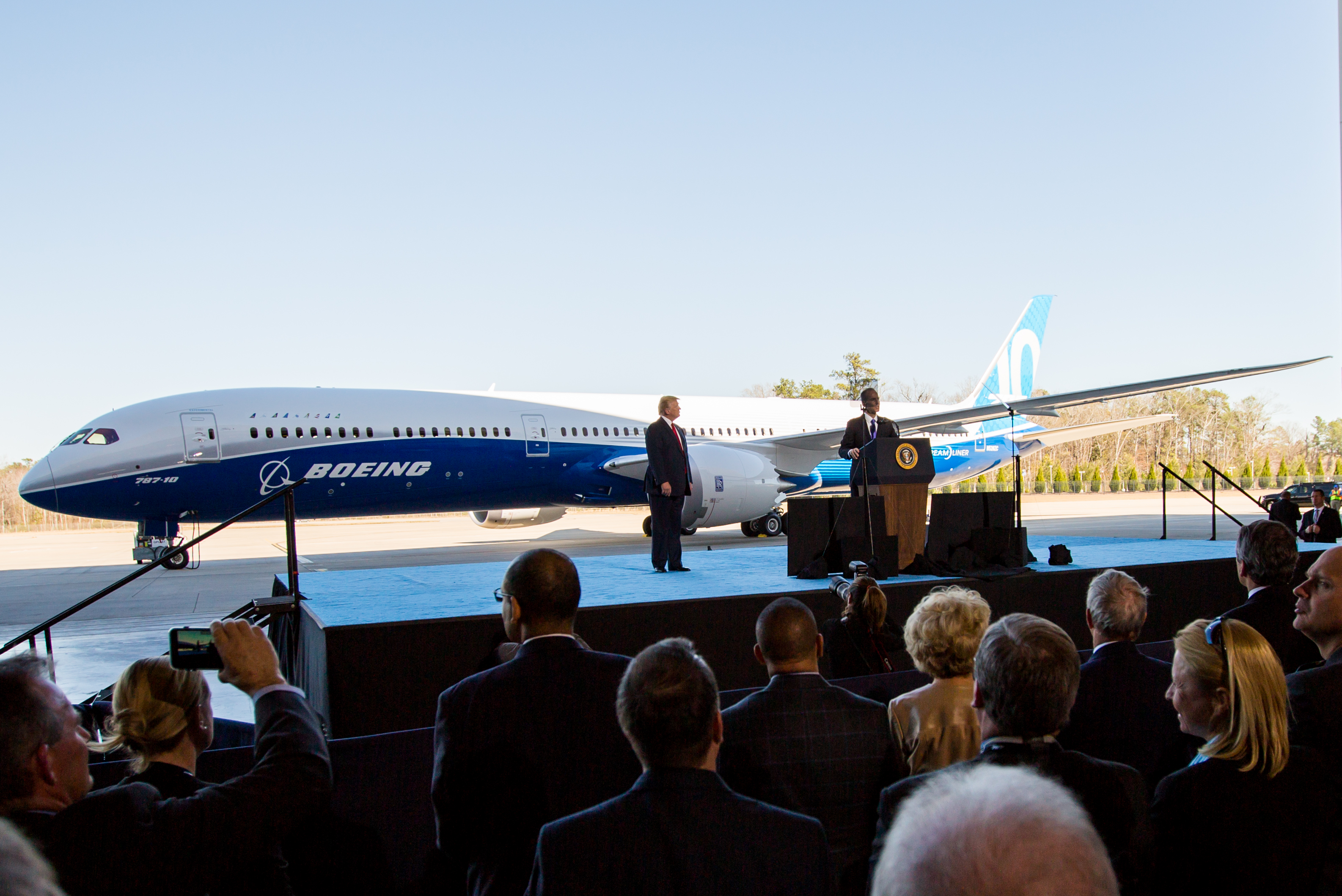
Boeing CEO Dennis Muilenburg and US President Donald Trump at the 787-10 Dreamliner rollout ceremony in 2017

In 2007 and 2008, the company benefited from over 10 billion dollars in USD of long-term loan guarantees, helping finance the purchase of their commercial aircraft in countries including Brazil, Canada, Ireland, and the United Arab Emirates, from the Export-Import Bank of the United States, some 65% of the total loan guarantees the bank made in that period.

In 2008 and 2009, Boeing was second on the list of Top 100 US Federal Contractors, with contracts totaling US$22 billion and US$23 billion respectively. Between 1995 and early 2021, the company agreed to pay US$4.3 billion to settle 84 instances of misconduct, including US$615 million in 2006 in relation to illegal hiring of government officials and improper use of proprietary information.

Boeing's spent US$16.9 million on lobbying expenditures in 2009. In the 2008 presidential election, Barack Obama "was by far the biggest recipient of campaign contributions from Boeing employees and executives, hauling in US$197,000 – five times as much as John McCain, and more than the top eight Republicans combined".

Boeing has a corporate citizenship program centered on charitable contributions in five areas: education, health, human services, environment, the arts, culture, and civic engagement. In February 2012, Boeing Global Corporate Citizenship partnered with the Insight Labs to develop a new model for foundations to more effectively lead the sectors they serve.

The company is a member of the U.S. Global Leadership Coalition, a Washington D.C.–based coalition of more than 400 major companies and NGOs that advocate a larger International Affairs Budget, which funds American diplomatic and development efforts abroad. A series of U.S. diplomatic cables show how U.S. diplomats and senior politicians intervene on behalf of Boeing to help boost the company's sales. In Donald Trump's administrations, Paolo Zampolli has styled himself as "Boeing’s number-two salesperson in the world, right after the president", which the company did not confirm, and claimed that, when foreign governments want access to Trump, he tells them "If you want to make the president happy, buy Boeing.”

Boeing secured the highest-ever tax breaks at the state level in 2013.

In March 2025, Boeing was awarded a contract to build the U.S. Air Force's most sophisticated fighter, known as Next Generation Air Dominance, in a contract worth more than $20 billion.

=== Criticism ===
In December 2011, the non-partisan organization Public Campaign criticized Boeing for spending US$52.29 million on lobbying and not paying taxes from 2008 to 2010, instead getting US$178 million in tax rebates, despite making a profit of US$9.7 billion, laying off 14,862 workers since 2008, and increasing executive pay by 31% to US$41.9 million in 2010 for its top five executives.

Boeing has been accused of unethical practices (in violation of the Procurement Integrity Act) while attempting to submit a revised bid to NASA for their lunar landing project.

==== War profiteering ====
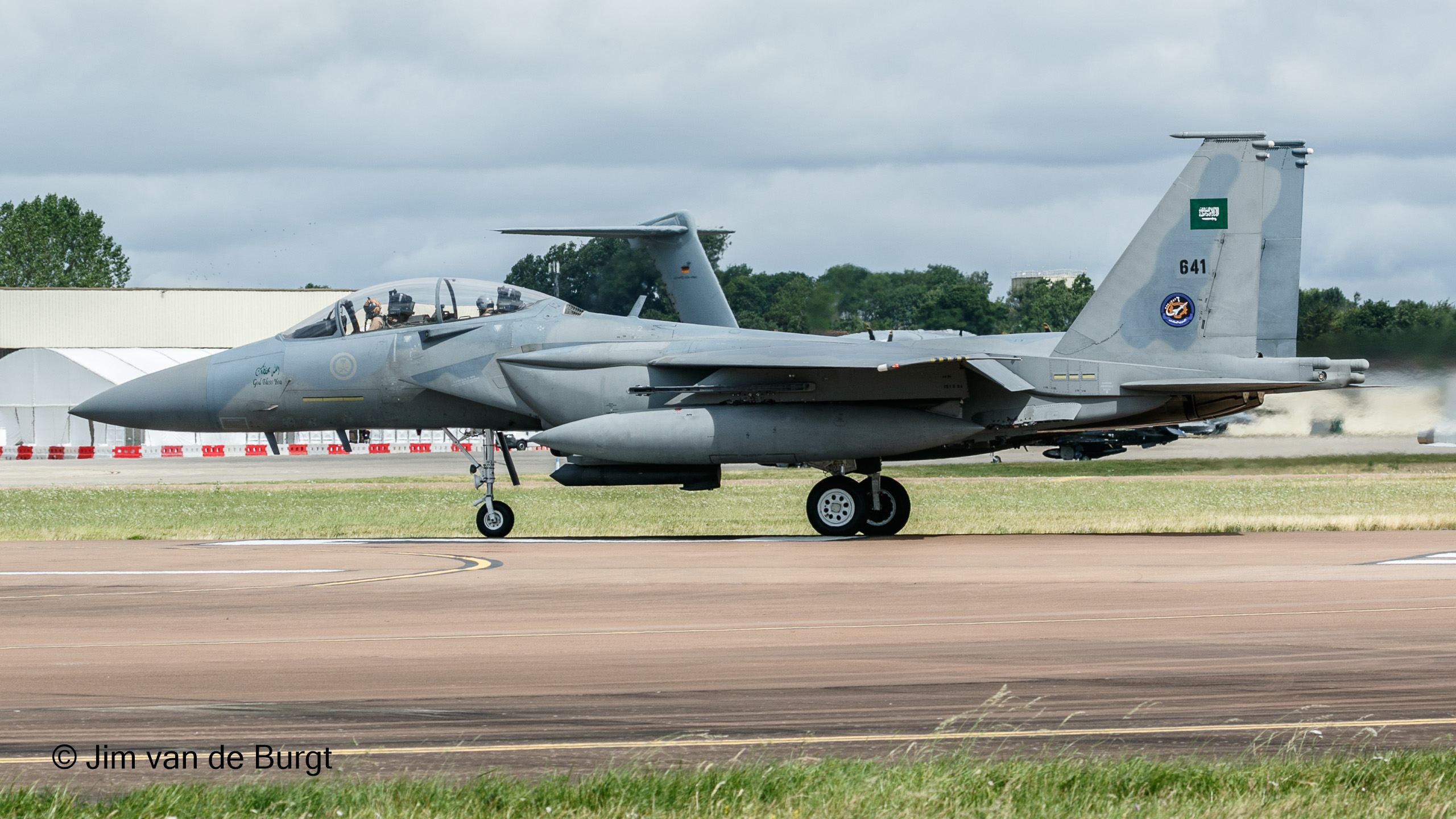
The F-15S/SA jetfighters are one of the major combatants that Boeing has sold to the Saudi Arabia. The aircraft are heavily utilized in the Saudi-led intervention in the Yemeni civil war.

The firm has been criticized for supplying and profiting from wars, including the war in Yemen where its missiles were found to be used for indiscriminate attacks, killing many civilians. In 2017 Boeing signed a deal with Saudi Arabia which included Saudi Arabia buying military aircraft and guided missile systems. Research has estimated Boeing made between $50 billion to $100 billion in revenue via Israeli weapons contracts from 2009 through 2022, in the years leading up to the Gaza war.

In 2023, it was reported that Boeing sent 1,000 small diameter "smart" bombs for the first week of Israeli air attacks on Gaza, which were shipped from a US Air Force base by Israeli Air Force. During the Gaza war, Boeing's stock prices soared due to additional Israeli weapons contracts, while mass demonstrations sought to interrupt defense supplier summits and block shipments of weapons for the Israel Defense Forces at Boeing facilities in St. Charles, Missouri, Tukwila, Washington, and Gresham, Oregon, due to the mass violations of International humanitarian law committed by Israel. Students at Florida State University, University of Washington, Saint Louis University, University of Missouri–St. Louis, and Washington University in St. Louis called for their institutions to break partnerships with Boeing.

In 2024, students on hunger strike at Brown University named Boeing among the list of corporations to divest from. Five protestors, in opposition to Boeing sales to Israel, were arrested on felony charges after blocking entrances to a Boeing facility in Heath, Ohio. The student union at Washington University in St. Louis passed a resolution calling on the university to divest from Boeing.

Israel has used the Boeing manufactured GBU-39 Small Diameter Bomb during the Gaza war, including in bombings of a Rafah refugee tent camp, the Al-Sardi school, and the Al-Tabaeen school.

=== Sanctions ===
In December 2025, China has imposed sanctions on 10 individuals and 20 US defense companies, including a Boeing manufacturing facility. The measures include freezing assets in China and banning Chinese citizens and organizations from doing business with them. The decision comes after the US announced an $11.1 billion arms sale to Taiwan, the largest arms deal in history.

== Financials ==
The key trends of Boeing are (as at the financial year ending December 31):

Year	Revenue in billion US$	Net income (loss) in billion US$	Employees	Refs
2005	53.6	2.5		
2006	61.5	2.2		
2007	66.3	4.0		
2008	60.9	2.6		
2009	68.2	1.3		
2010	64.3	3.2		
2011	68.7	4.0		
2012	81.6	3.9		
2013	86.6	4.5	168,400	
2014	90.7	5.4	165,500	
2015	96.1	5.1	161,400	
2016	94.5	4.8	150,500	
2017	93.3	8.1	140,800	
2018	101	10.4	153,000	
2019	76.5	(0.63)	161,000	
2020	58.1	(11.9)	141,014	
2021	62.2	(4.2)	140,000	
2022	66.6	(5.1)	156,000	
2023	77.7	(2.2)	171,000	
2024	66.5	(11.8)	172,000	
2025	89.5	2.2	182,000	

Revenue by business segment (2024)
Business	Revenue in billion $	Revenue share
Commercial Airplanes	22.9	34.4%
Defense, Space & Security	23.9	36.0%
Global Services	20.0	30.1%
Other	(0.2)	(0.003%)
Total	66.5	

Between 2010 and 2018, Boeing increased its operating cash flow from $3 to $15.3 billion, sustaining its share price, by negotiating advance payments from customers and delaying payments to its suppliers. This strategy is sustainable only as long as orders are good and delivery rates are increasing.

From 2013 to 2019, Boeing spent over $60 billion on dividends and stock buybacks, twice as much as the development costs of the 787.

In 2020, Boeing's second quarter revenue was $11.8 billion as a result of the pandemic slump. Due to higher sales in other divisions and an influx in deliveries of commercial jetliners in 2021, second quarter revenue increased by 44%, reaching nearly $17 billion.

Revenues decreased 15 percent to $16.9 billion in the second quarter of 2024, compared to the same time period in 2023. The company's operating loss amounted to $1.39 billion and its net loss to $1.43 billion, while plane deliveries fell to 92 (from 136 in 2023).

In 2024, Boeing delivered just 348 aircraft to its customers, its lowest output since the COVID-19 pandemic. Boeing ended the year with a backlog of 5,595 unfilled orders.

In 2025, Boeing outpaced its main rival Airbus.

== Employment numbers ==
The company's employment totals are listed below.

Employment by group (December 31, 2023)
Group	Employees
Boeing Commercial Airplanes (BCA)	47,948
Boeing Defense, Space & Security (BDS)	17,925
Global Services	22,323
Enterprise	82,492
Total company	170,688

Employment by location (December 31, 2023)
Location	Employees
Alabama	3,411
Arizona	5,208
California	14,403
Missouri	16,681
Oklahoma	3,945
Pennsylvania	4,055
South Carolina	7,864
Texas	7,090
Washington	66,797
Other locations	41,234
Total company	170,688

Approximately 1.5% of Boeing employees are in the Technical Fellowship program, a program through which Boeing's top engineers and scientists set technical direction for the company. The average salary at Boeing was $76,784 in 2011, as reported by former employees.

== Corporate governance ==
In 2022, Rory Kennedy made a documentary film, Downfall: The Case Against Boeing, streamed by Netflix. She said about the 21st-century history of Boeing "There were many decades when Boeing did extraordinary things by focusing on excellence and safety and ingenuity. Those three virtues were seen as the key to profit. It could work, and beautifully. And then they were taken over by a group that decided Wall Street was the end-all, be-all."

On May 5, 2022, Boeing announced that it would be moving its headquarters from Chicago to Arlington, Virginia in the Washington, D.C. metropolitan area. Additionally, it plans to add a research and technology center in Northern Virginia.

In July 2024, it announced a new CEO, Kelly Ortberg. On August 8, 2024, he met with FAA Administrator Michael Whitaker to discuss the company's future direction. Ortberg has communicated his commitment to reinforcing Boeing's position as an industry leader and has outlined his vision for the company's continued success.

=== Board ===
As of 2022, Boeing is headed by a president who also serves as the chief executive officer. The roles of chair of the board and CEO were separated in October 2019.

Chair of the Board
Name	Background
Steven M. Mollenkopf	Former CEO, Qualcomm
Board of Directors
Name	Background
Robert A. Bradway	Chair and CEO, Amgen
Mortimer J. Buckley	Former chairman and CEO, The Vanguard Group
Lynne M. Doughtie	Former U.S. chair and CEO, KPMG
David L. Gitlin	Chairman and CEO, Carrier Global Corporation
Lynn Good	Former chair and CEO, Duke Energy
Stayce Harris	Former United Airlines pilot Former inspector general, U.S. Air Force
Akhil Johri	Former executive vice-president and CFO, United Technologies Corporation
David L. Joyce	Former president and CEO, GE Aviation; Former vice-chair, General Electric Company
Kelly Ortberg	President and CEO, the Boeing Company
John M. Richardson	Former chief of naval operations, U.S. Navy; Former director of the Naval Nuclear Propulsion Program, U.S. Navy

=== Past leadership ===
Chief Executive Officer		President		Chairman	
N/A	Position not created	N/A	Position not created	1916–1934	William Boeing
N/A	Position not created	1922–1925	Edgar Gott	1916–1934	William Boeing
N/A	Position not created	1926–1933	Philip G. Johnson	1916–1934	William Boeing
1933–1939	Claire Egtvedt	1933–1939	Claire Egtvedt	1934–1968	Claire Egtvedt
1939–1944	Philip G. Johnson	1939–1944	Philip G. Johnson	1934–1968	Claire Egtvedt
1944–1945	Claire Egtvedt	1944–1945	Claire Egtvedt	1934–1968	Claire Egtvedt
1945–1968	William M. Allen	1945–1968	William M. Allen	1934–1968	Claire Egtvedt
1969–1986	Thornton Wilson	1968–1972	Thornton Wilson	1968–1972	William M. Allen
1969–1986	Thornton Wilson	1972–1985	Malcolm T. Stamper	1972–1987	Thornton Wilson
1986–1996	Frank Shrontz	1985–1996	Frank Shrontz	1985–1996	Frank Shrontz
1996–2003	Philip M. Condit	1996–1997	Philip M. Condit	1997–2003	Philip M. Condit
2003–2005	Harry Stonecipher	1997–2005	Harry Stonecipher	2003–2005	Lewis E. Platt
2005–2015	James McNerney	2005–2013	James McNerney	2005–2016	James McNerney
2015–2019	Dennis Muilenburg	2013–2019	Dennis Muilenburg	2016–2019	Dennis Muilenburg
2015–2019	Dennis Muilenburg	2013–2019	Dennis Muilenburg	2019	Dave Calhoun
2020–2024	Dave Calhoun	2020–2024	Dave Calhoun	2019–2024	Lawrence Kellner
2020–2024	Dave Calhoun	2020–2024	Dave Calhoun	2024–present	Steve Mollenkopf
2024–present	Kelly Ortberg	2024–present	Kelly Ortberg	2024–present	Steve Mollenkopf

== See also ==
- Boeing Everett Factory – main production facility for commercial widebody aircraft
- Competition between Airbus and Boeing
- Downfall: The Case Against Boeing – Netflix film on the long history of safety shortcuts, corporate mismanagement and coverups of the 737 MAX
- Future of Flight Aviation Center & Boeing Tour – Corporate public museum
- United Aircraft Corporation
- United States Air Force Plant 42
