= Philip G. Johnson =

American aviation industrialist

Philip Gustav Johnson (November 5, 1894 – September 14, 1944) was a Swedish-American pioneer in the manufacturing of airplanes and in the creation and operation of commercial airlines in the United States and Canada. With backgrounds as an engineer and businessman, Johnson served as president of Boeing, United Airlines and Kenworth.

== Biography ==
Philip Gustav Johnson was born the son of Swedish immigrants Charles and Hannah Johnson in Seattle, Washington. He graduated from the University of Washington in 1917 with a degree in mechanical engineering. In Johnson's senior year, William Boeing recruited him for a position at the fledgling Boeing Company, which came into being in July 1916. Johnson started working for Boeing as draftsman in the engineering department. He was named president in 1926.

In 1929, Boeing combined with Pratt & Whitney and other companies to form a large conglomerate known as the United Aircraft and Transport Corporation. Johnson headed this holding company, which was broken up by legislative action in the aftermath of the Air Mail scandal of 1934. Johnson became president of United Airlines, which emerged from this restructuring, but was officially barred from the airline industry for several years, along with many other air executives who had attended the so-called "Spoils Conference" of 1930, when commercial air mail contracts were first awarded. Subsequent evaluation vindicated Johnson and his fellow airline industry captains, who were unfairly tarred in the press because no collusive behavior counter to the public good in fact occurred at that meeting.

Unable at that time to participate in the U.S. airline industry, Johnson in 1937 departed the United States for Canada, where he helped form Trans-Canada Airlines as its Vice President of Operations. A superb businessman, he also served as president of truck manufacturer Kenworth Truck Company from 1937 until his death. In 1939, the federal legislation that had driven Johnson out of Boeing was rescinded. He returned to Boeing as president, focusing on the war production required by World War II.

Johnson also served on the board of directors for the Pacific National Bank, Puget Sound Power and Light, and Puget Sound Navigation Company. For his numerous accomplishments, he was also named the “First Citizen” of Seattle in 1943. While overseeing operations at the Boeing plant in Wichita, Kansas, he died the following year at the age of 49 from a cerebral hemorrhage. In 1990, Philip G. Johnson was honored when The Boeing Company endowed an engineering chair at the University of Washington in his name.

== Other sources ==
- Boeing History: Philip G. Johnson
- United Airlines History Web site
- Kenworth History – 1936 to 1944
- HistoryLink.org: Johnson, Philip G. (1894–1944)
- P.G. Johnson Estate Woodway
