= History of Boeing =

History of the aerospace and defense corporation

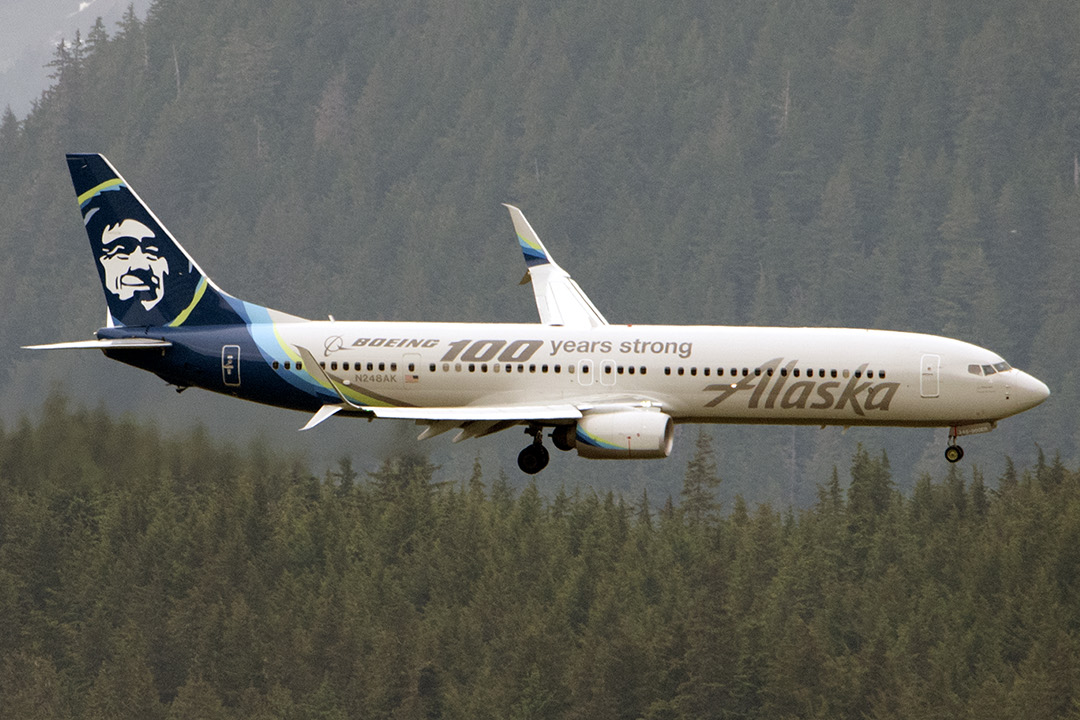
Boeing celebrated its 100th anniversary on July 15, 2016

== "Boeing Is Better Than The Old Boeing." - William E. Boeing ==
=== Before 1930 ===
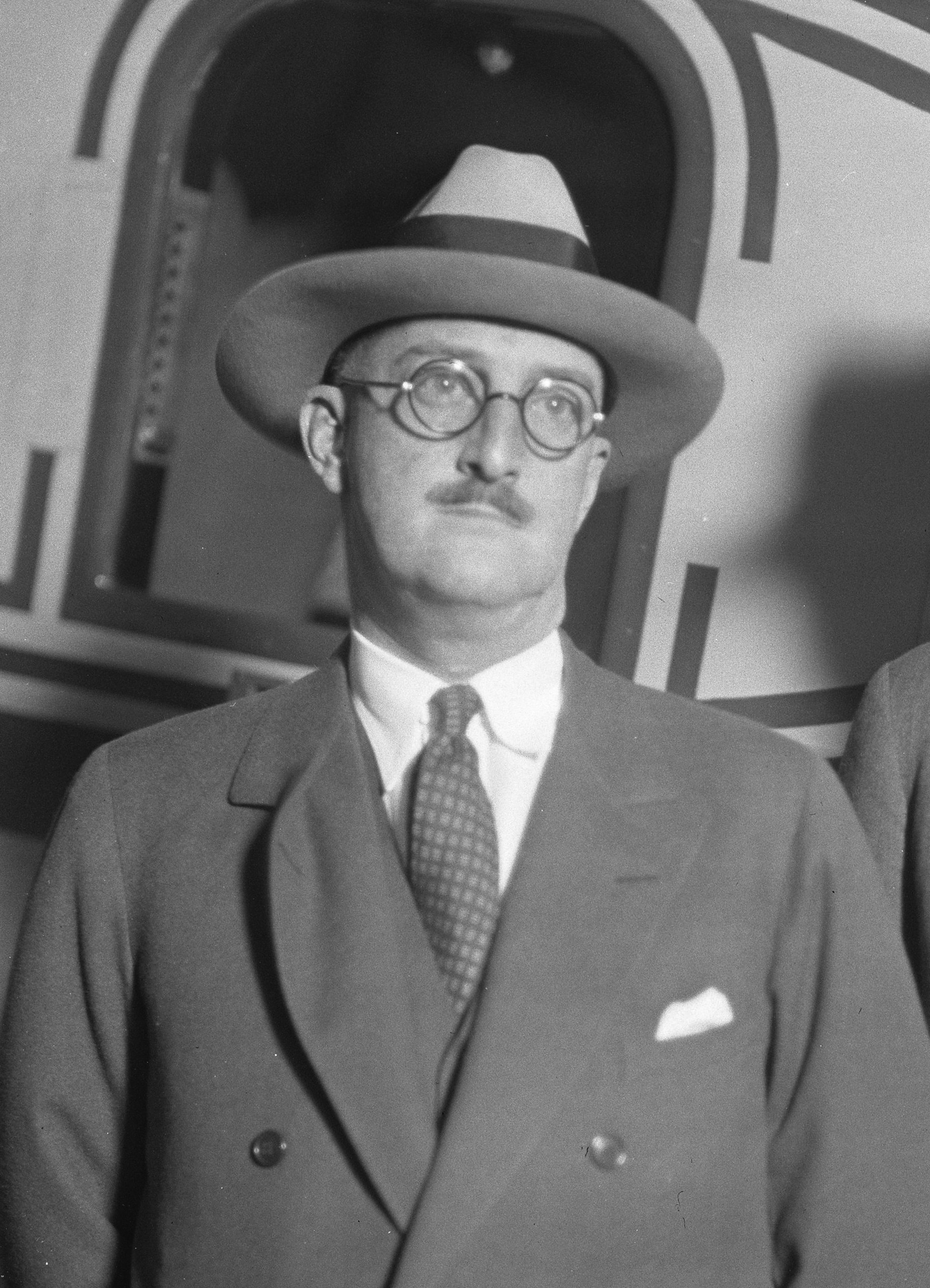
William E. Boeing in 1929

In 1909, William E. Boeing, a wealthy lumber entrepreneur who studied at Yale University, became fascinated with airplanes after seeing one at the Alaska-Yukon-Pacific Exposition in Seattle. In 1910, he bought the Heath Shipyard, a wooden boat manufacturing facility at the mouth of the Duwamish River, which would become his first airplane factory. In 1915, Boeing traveled to Los Angeles to be taught flying by Glenn Martin and purchased a Martin "Flying Birdcage" seaplane (so-called because of all the guy-wires holding it together). The aircraft was shipped disassembled by rail to the northeast shore of Lake Union, where Martin's pilot and handyman James Floyd Smith assembled it in a tent hangar. The Birdcage was damaged in a crash during testing, and when Martin informed Boeing that replacement parts would not become available for months, Boeing realized he could build his own plane in that amount of time. He put the idea to his friend George Conrad Westervelt, a U.S. Navy engineer, who agreed to work on an improved design and help build the new airplane, called the "B&W" seaplane. Boeing made good use of his Duwamish boatworks and its woodworkers under the direction of Edward Heath, from whom he bought it, in fabricating wooden components to be assembled at Lake Union. Westervelt was transferred to the east coast by the Navy before the plane was finished, however, Boeing hired Wong Tsu to replace Westervelt's engineering expertise, and completed two B&Ws in the lakeside hangar. On June 15, 1916, the B&W took its maiden flight. Seeing the opportunity to be a regular producer of airplanes, with the expertise of Mr. Wong, suitable productive facilities, and an abundant supply of spruce wood suitable for aircraft, Boeing incorporated his airplane manufacturing business as "Pacific Aero Products Co" on July 15, 1916. The B&W airplanes were offered to the US Navy but they were not interested, and regular production of airplanes would not begin until US entry into World War I a year later. On April 26, 1917 (Note: Author Edgar A. Haine writes that the company changed its name from Pacific Aero Products Co. changes name to Boeing Airplane Company on April 18, 1917, and then to The Boeing Company on May 3, 1961. An official Boeing biography published on William E. Boeing says the name change happened on May 17, 1917. But a history of the company published by Boeing says April 26, 1917.), Boeing changed the name to the "Boeing Airplane Company". Boeing was later reincorporated in Delaware; the original Certificate of Incorporation was filed with the Secretary of State of Delaware on July 19, 1934.

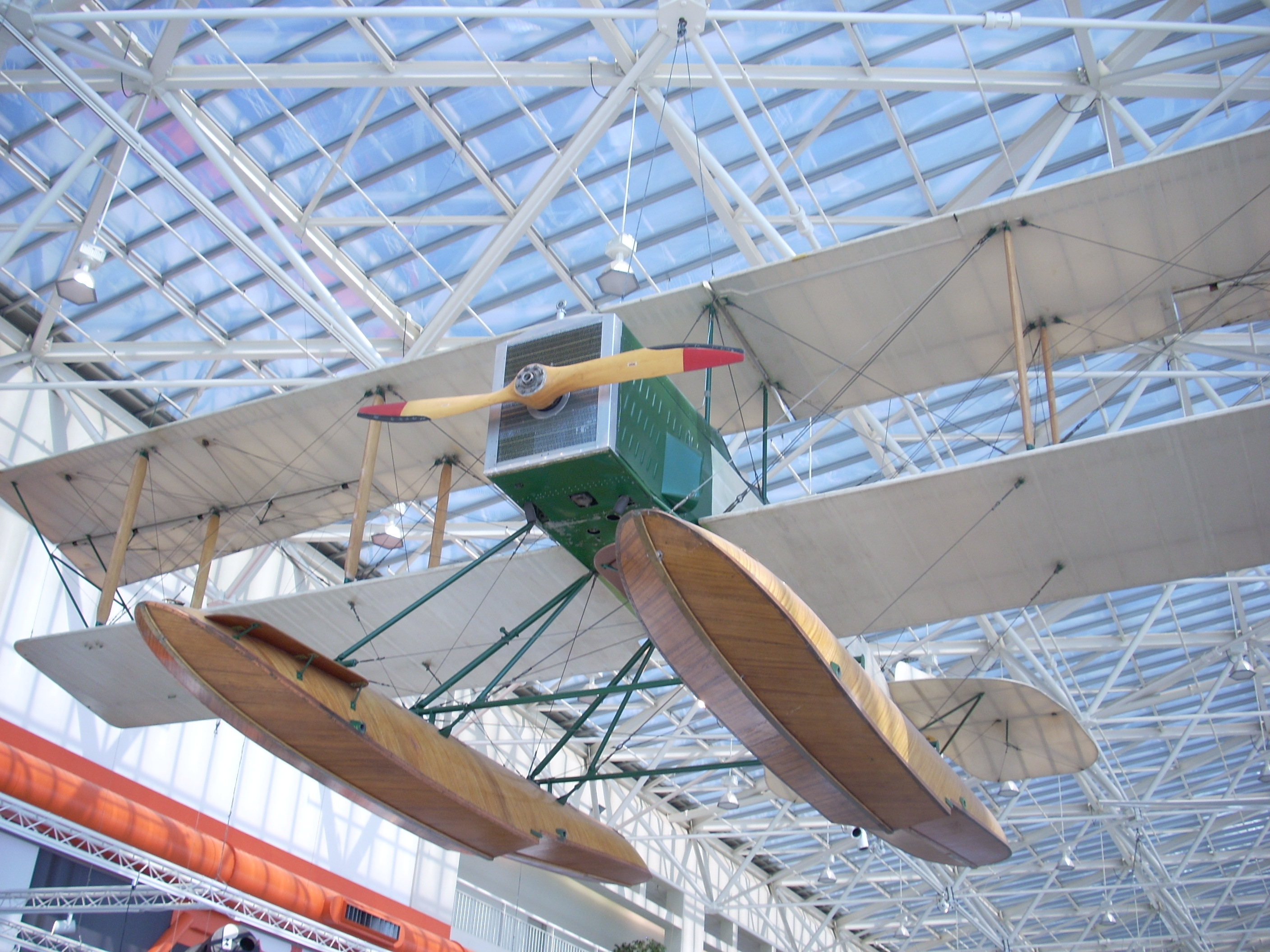
Replica of Boeing's first plane, the Boeing Model 1, at the Museum of Flight

In 1917, the company moved its operations to Boeing's Duwamish boatworks, which became Boeing Plant 1. The Boeing Airplane Company's first engineer was Wong Tsu, a Chinese graduate of the Massachusetts Institute of Technology hired by Boeing in May 1916. He designed the Boeing Model 2, which was Boeing's first financial success. On April 6, 1917, the U.S. had declared war on Germany and entered World War I. With the U.S. entering the war, Boeing knew that the U.S. Navy needed seaplanes for training, so Boeing shipped two new Model 2s to Pensacola, Florida, where the planes were flown for the Navy. The Navy liked the Model 2 and ordered 50 more. In light of this financial windfall, "from Bill Boeing onward, the company's chief executives through the decades were careful to note that without Wong Tsu's efforts, especially with the Model 2, the company might not have survived the early years to become the dominant world aircraft manufacturer."

When World War I ended in 1918, a large surplus of cheap, used military planes flooded the commercial airplane market, preventing aircraft companies from selling any new airplanes, driving many out of business. Others, including Boeing, started selling other products. Boeing built dressers, counters, and furniture, along with flat-bottom boats called Sea Sleds.

In 1919, the Boeing Model 6 flying boat made its first flight. It accommodated one pilot, two passengers and some mail. Over the course of eight years, it made international airmail flights from Seattle to Victoria, British Columbia. On May 24, 1920, the Boeing Model 8 made its first flight. It was the first airplane to fly over Mount Rainier.

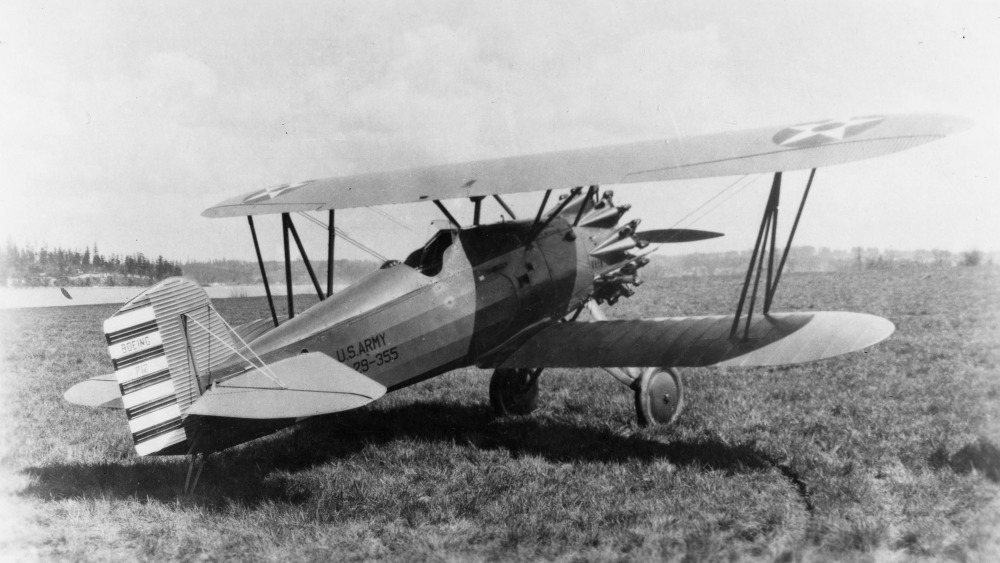
P-12 air superiority fighter

In 1923, Boeing entered competition against Curtiss to develop a pursuit fighter for the U.S. Army Air Service. The Army accepted both designs and Boeing continued to develop its Boeing Model 15 fighter into the subsequent radial-engined F2B F3B, and P12/F4B fighters, which made Boeing a leading manufacturer of fighters over the course of the next decade.

In 1925, Boeing built its Model 40 mail airplane for the U.S. government to use on airmail routes. In 1927, an improved version, the Model 40A was built. The Model 40A won the U.S. Post Office's contract to deliver mail between San Francisco and Chicago. This model also had a cabin to accommodate two passengers.

That same year, Boeing created an airline named Boeing Air Transport, which merged a year later with Pacific Air Transport and the Boeing Airplane Company. The first airmail flight for the airline was on July 1, 1927. In 1929, the company merged with Pratt & Whitney, Hamilton Aero Manufacturing Company, and Chance Vought under the new title United Aircraft and Transport Corporation. The merger was followed by the acquisition of the Sikorsky Manufacturing Corporation, Stearman Aircraft Corporation, and Standard Metal Propeller Company. United Aircraft then purchased National Air Transport in 1930.

On July 27, 1928, the 12-passenger Boeing 80 biplane made its first flight. With three engines, it was Boeing's first plane built with the sole intention of being a passenger transport. An upgraded version, the 80A, carrying eighteen passengers, made its first flight in September 1929.

=== 1930s and 1940s ===
In the early 1930s, Boeing became a leader in all-metal aircraft construction, and in the design revolution that established the path for transport aircraft through the 1930s. In 1930, Boeing built the Monomail, a low-wing all-metal monoplane that carried mail. The low drag airframe with cantilever wings and the retractable landing gear was so revolutionary that the engines and propellers of the time were not adequate to realize the potential of the plane. By the time controllable pitch propellers were developed, Boeing was building its Model 247 airliner. Two Monomails were built. The second one, the Model 221, had a 6-passenger cabin. In 1931, the Monomail design became the foundation of the Boeing YB-9, the first all-metal, cantilever-wing, monoplane bomber. Five examples entered service between September 1932 and March 1933. The performance of the twin-engine monoplane bomber led to a reconsideration of air defense requirements, although it was soon rendered obsolete by rapidly advancing bomber designs.

In 1932, Boeing introduced the Model 248, the first all-metal monoplane fighter. The P-26 Peashooter was in front-line service with the US Army Air Corps from 1934 to 1938.

In 1933, the Boeing 247 was introduced, which set the standard for all competitors in the passenger transport market. The 247 was an all-metal low-wing monoplane that was much faster, safer, and easier to fly than other passenger aircraft. For example, it was the first twin-engine passenger aircraft that could fly on one engine. In an era of unreliable engines, this vastly improved flight safety. Boeing built the first 59 aircraft exclusively for its own United Airlines subsidiary's operations. The direction established with the 247 was further developed by Douglas Aircraft, resulting in one of the most successful designs in aviation history.

The Air Mail Act of 1934 prohibited airlines and manufacturers from being under the same corporate umbrella, so the company split into three smaller companies – Boeing Airplane Company, United Airlines, and United Aircraft Corporation, the precursor to United Technologies. Boeing retained the Stearman facilities in Wichita, Kansas. Following the breakup of United Aircraft, William Boeing sold off his shares and left Boeing. Clairmont "Claire" L. Egtvedt, who had become Boeing's president in 1933, became the chairman as well. He believed the company's future was in building bigger planes. Work began in 1936 on Boeing Plant 2 to accommodate the production of larger modern aircraft.

From 1934 to 1937, Boeing was developing an experimental long-range bomber, the XB-15. At its introduction in 1937, it was the largest heavier-than-air craft built to date. Trials revealed that its speed was unsatisfactory, but the design experience was used in the development of the Model 299 prototype four-engine bomber of 1935, which was developed into the YB-17 of 1936, and the Model 314 flying boat that first flew in 1938.

Overlapping with the period of the YB-15 development, an agreement with Pan American World Airways (Pan Am) was reached, to develop and build a commercial flying boat able to carry passengers on transoceanic routes. The first flight of the Boeing 314 Clipper was in June 1938. It was the largest civil aircraft of its time, with a capacity of 90 passengers on day flights, and of 40 passengers on night flights. One year later, the first regular passenger service from the U.S. to the UK was inaugurated. Subsequently, other routes were opened, so that soon Pan Am flew with the Boeing 314 to destinations all over the world.

In 1938, Boeing completed work on its Model 307 Stratoliner. This was the first pressurized-cabin transport aircraft to enter airline service, and it was capable of cruising at an altitude of 20,000 feet (6,100 m) – above most weather disturbances. It used the wings, tail, and engines from the B-17.

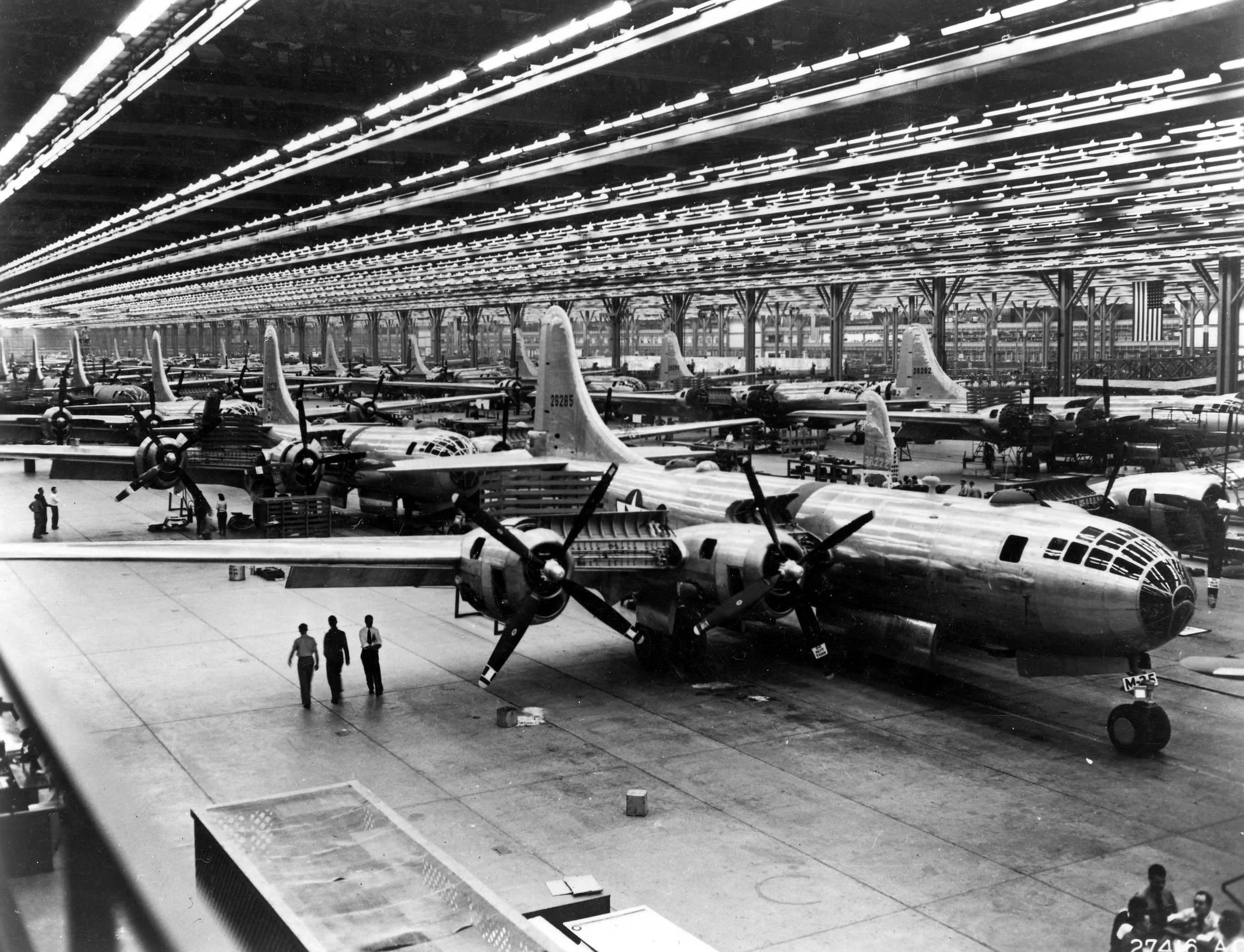
Boeing B-29 assembly line in Wichita, Kansas, 1944

During World War 2, Boeing built a large number of B-17 and B-29 bombers. Boeing ranked twelfth among United States corporations in the value of wartime production contracts. Many of the workers were women whose husbands had gone to war. In the beginning of March 1944, production had been scaled up in such a manner that over 350 planes were built each month. To prevent an attack from the air, the manufacturing plants had been covered with greenery and farmland items. During the war years the leading aircraft companies of the U.S. cooperated. The Boeing-designed B-17 bomber was assembled also by Vega (a subsidiary of Lockheed Aircraft Corp.) and Douglas Aircraft Co., while the B-29 was assembled also by Bell Aircraft Co. and by Glenn L. Martin Company. In 1942 Boeing started the development of the C-97 Stratofreighter, the first of a generation of heavy-lift military transports; it became operational in 1947. The C-97 design would be successfully adapted for use as an aerial refueling tanker, although its role as a mode of transport was soon limited by designs that had advantages in either versatility or capacity.

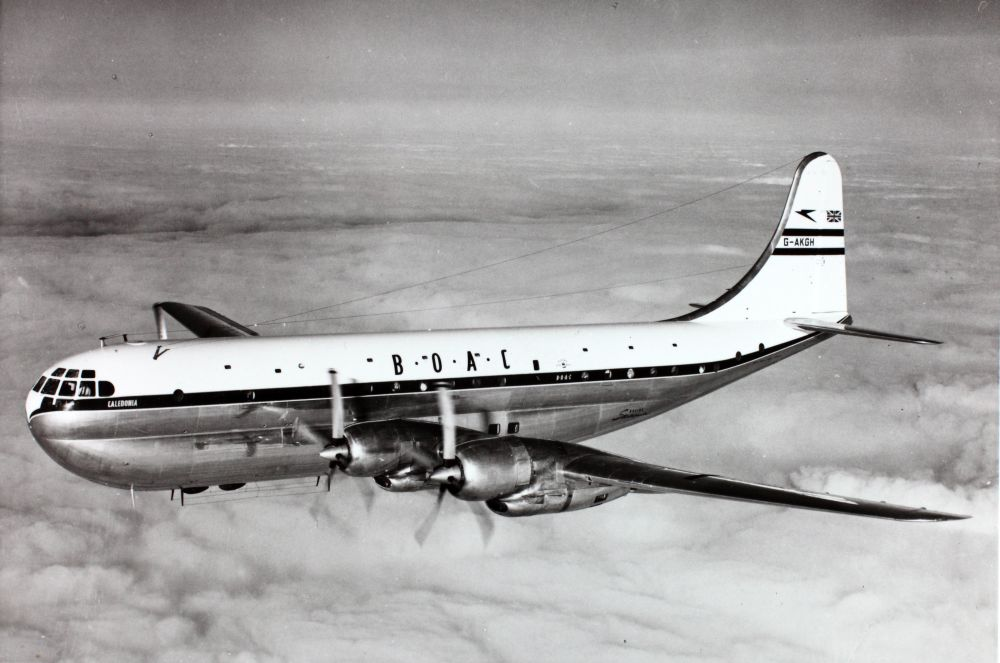
Boeing 377 Stratocruiser of BOAC

After the war, most orders of bombers were cancelled and 70,000 people lost their jobs at Boeing. The company aimed to recover quickly by selling its Stratocruiser (the Model 377), a luxurious four-engine commercial airliner derived from the C-97. However, sales of this model were not as expected and Boeing had to seek other opportunities to overcome the situation. In 1947 Boeing flew its first jet aircraft, the XB-47, from which the highly successful B-47 and B-52 bombers were derived.

=== 1950s ===
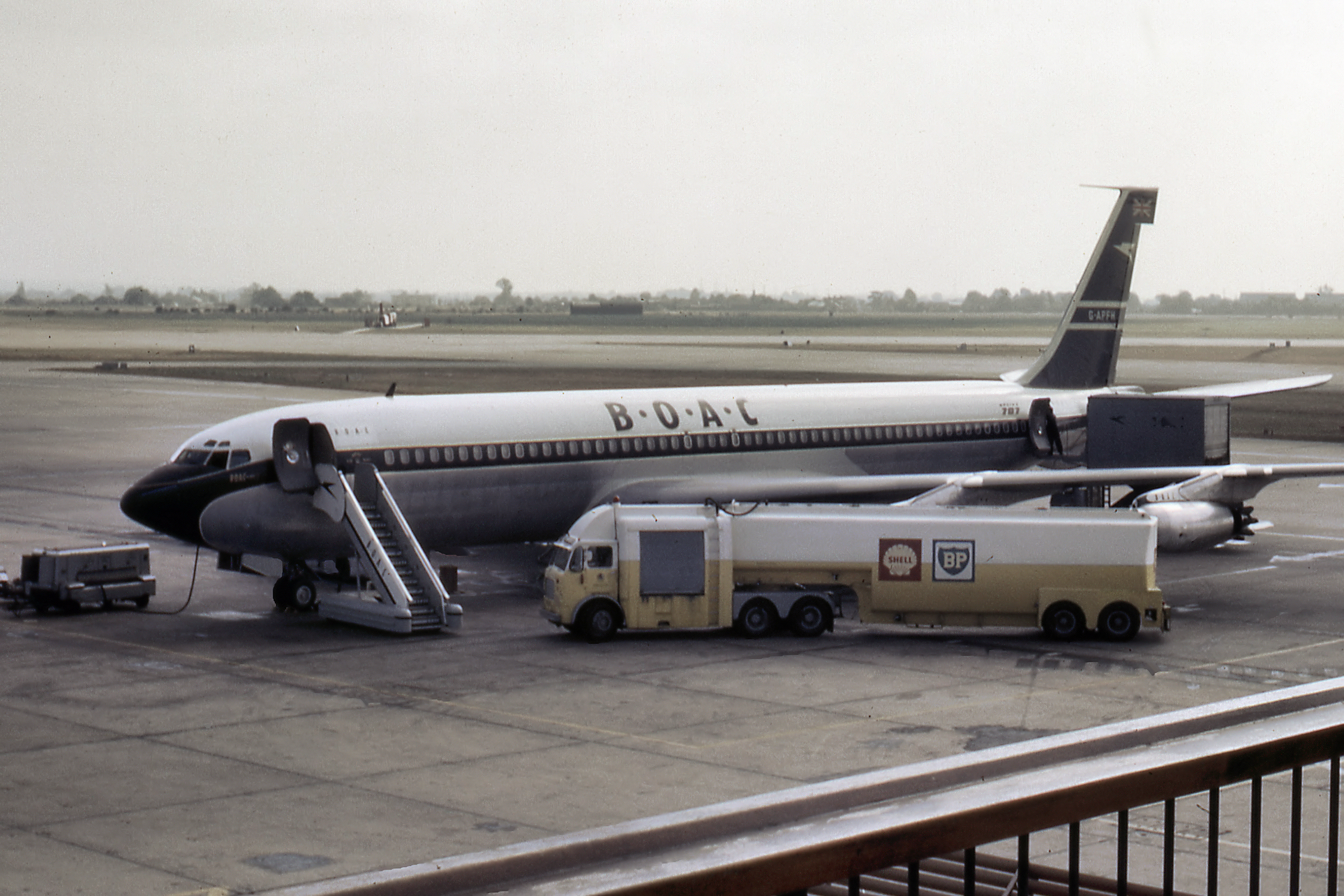
The Boeing 707 in British Overseas Airways Corporation (BOAC) livery, 1964

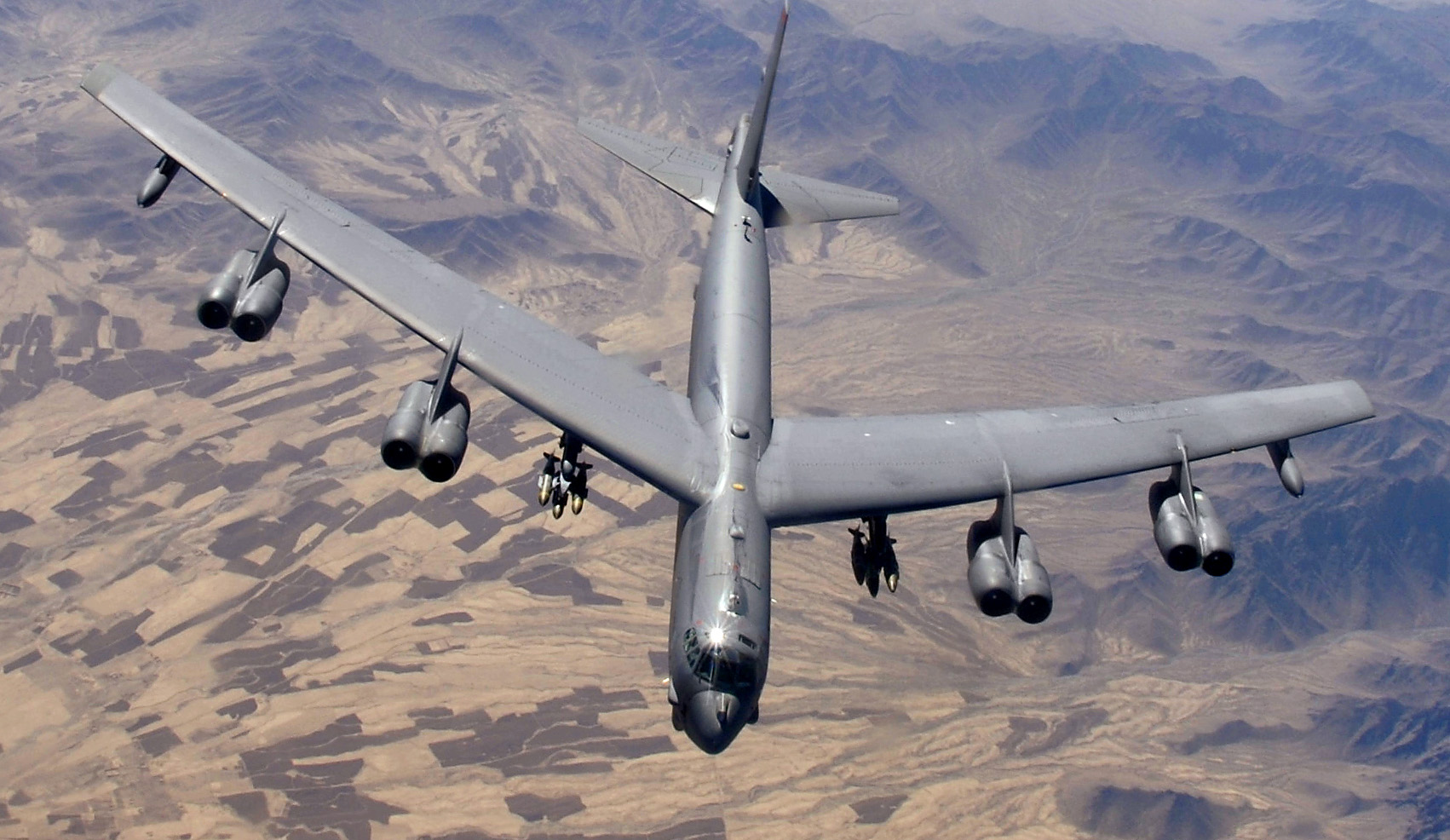
B-52 bomber

Boeing developed military jets such as the B-47 Stratojet and B-52 Stratofortress bombers in the late-1940s and into the 1950s. During the early 1950s, Boeing used company funds to develop the 367–80 jet airliner demonstrator that led to the KC-135 Stratotanker and Boeing 707 jetliner. Some of these were built at Boeing's facilities in Wichita, Kansas, which existed from 1931 to 2014.

Between the last delivery of a 377 in 1950 and the first order for the 707 in 1955, Boeing was shut out of the commercial aircraft market.

In the mid-1950s technology had advanced significantly, which gave Boeing the opportunity to develop and manufacture new products. One of the first was the guided short-range missile used to intercept enemy aircraft. By that time the Cold War had become a fact of life, and Boeing used its short-range missile technology to develop and build an intercontinental missile.

In 1958, Boeing began delivery of its 707, the United States' first commercial jet airliner, in response to the British De Havilland Comet, French Sud Aviation Caravelle and Soviet Tupolev Tu-104, which were the world's first generation of commercial jet aircraft. With the 707, a four-engine, 156-passenger airliner, the U.S. became a leader in commercial jet manufacturing. A few years later, Boeing added a second version of this aircraft, the Boeing 720, which was slightly faster and had a shorter range.

Boeing Aircraft Maintenance & Development (1956) Official Boeing B-52 and B-47 promotional film reel.

Boeing was a major producer of small turbine engines during the 1950s and 1960s. The engines represented one of the company's major efforts to expand its product base beyond military aircraft after World War II. Development on the gas turbine engine started in 1943 and Boeing's gas turbines were designated models 502 (T50), 520 (T60), 540, 551 and 553. Boeing built 2,461 engines before production ceased in April 1968. Many applications of the Boeing gas turbine engines were considered to be firsts, including the first turbine-powered helicopter and boat.

=== 1960s ===
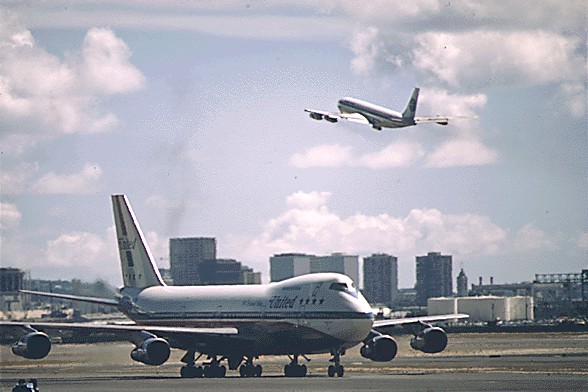
The 707 and 747 formed the backbone of many major airline fleets through the end of the 1970s, including United (747 shown) and Pan Am (707 shown)

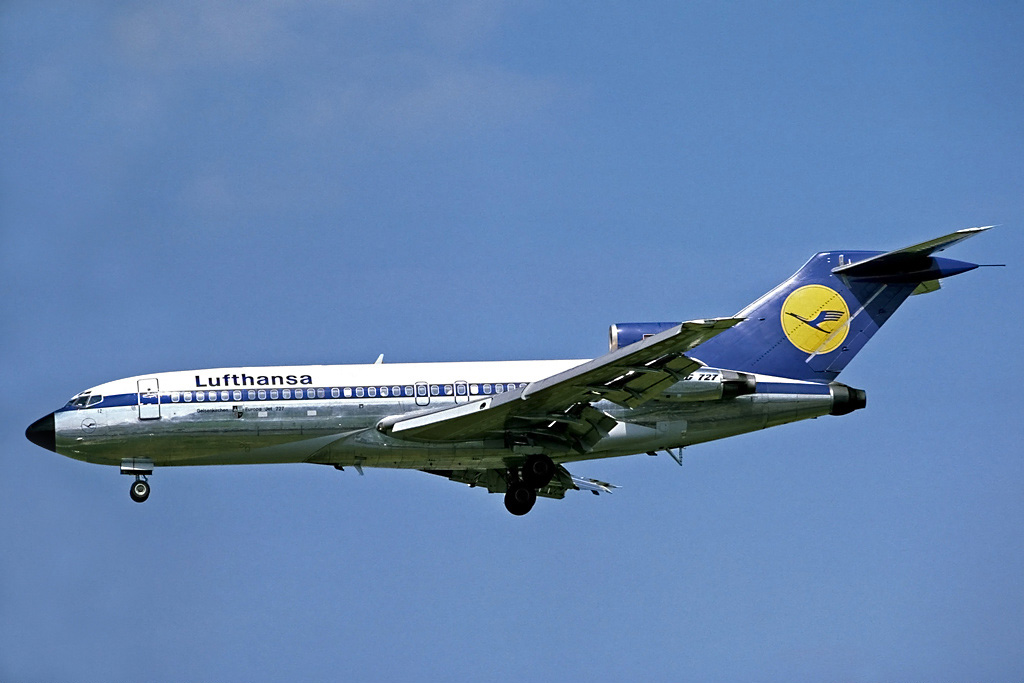
Lufthansa Boeing 727

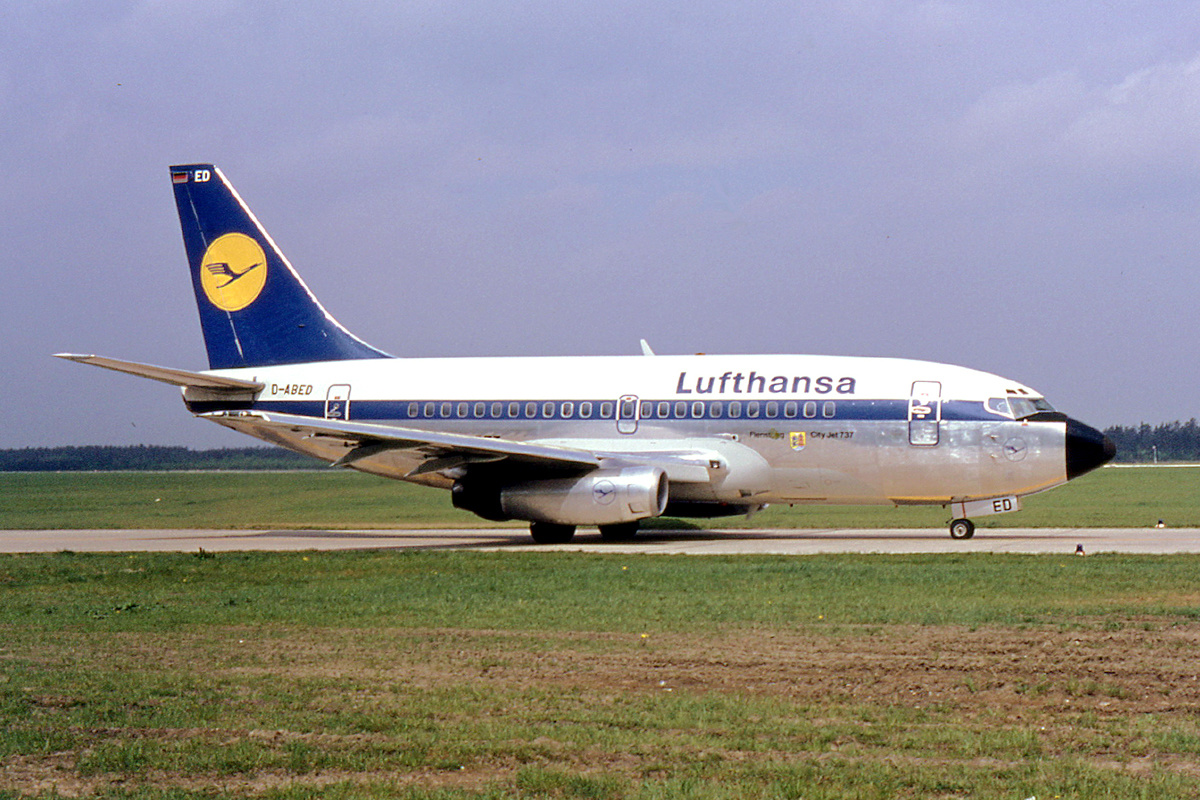
A Boeing 737, the best-selling commercial jet aircraft in aviation history

Vertol Aircraft Corporation was acquired by Boeing in 1960, and was reorganized as Boeing's Vertol division. The twin-rotor CH-47 Chinook, produced by Vertol, took its first flight in 1961. This heavy-lift helicopter remains a work-horse vehicle to the present day. In 1964, Vertol also began production of the CH-46 Sea Knight.

In December 1960, Boeing announced the model 727 jetliner, which went into commercial service about three years later. Different passenger, freight, and convertible freighter variants were developed for the 727. The 727 was the first commercial jetliner to reach 1,000 sales.

On May 21, 1961, the company shortened its name from Boeing Airplane Company to the current "Boeing Company".

Boeing won a contract in 1961 to manufacture the S-IC stage of the Saturn V rocket, manufactured at the Michoud Assembly Facility in New Orleans, Louisiana.

In 1966, Boeing president William M. Allen asked Malcolm T. Stamper to spearhead production of the new 747 airliner on which the company's future was riding. This was a monumental engineering and management challenge and included the construction of the world's biggest factory in which to build the 747 at Everett, Washington, a plant which is the size of 40 football fields.

In 1967, Boeing introduced another short- and medium-range airliner, the twin-engine 737. It has since become the best-selling commercial jet aircraft in aviation history. Several versions have been developed, mainly to increase seating capacity and range. The 737 remains in production as of January 2024 with the latest 737 MAX series.

The roll-out ceremonies for the first 747-100 took place in 1968, at the massive new factory in Everett, about an hour's drive from Boeing's Seattle home. The aircraft made its first flight a year later. The first commercial flight occurred in 1970. The 747 has an intercontinental range and a larger seating capacity than Boeing's previous aircraft.

Boeing also developed hydrofoils in the 1960s. The screw-driven USS High Point (PCH-1) was an experimental submarine hunter. The patrol hydrofoil USS Tucumcari (PGH-2) was more successful. Only one was built, but it saw service in Vietnam and Europe before running aground in 1972. Its waterjet and fully submersed flying foils were the examples for the later Pegasus-class patrol hydrofoils and the Model 929 Jetfoil ferries in the 1980s. The Tucumcari and later boats were produced in Renton. While the Navy hydrofoils were withdrawn from service in the late 1980s, the Boeing Jetfoils are still in service in Asia.

=== 1970s ===
In the early 1970s Boeing suffered from the simultaneous decline in Vietnam War military spending, the slowing of the space program as Project Apollo neared completion, the recession of 1969–70, and the company's $2 billion debt as it built the new 747 airliner. Boeing did not receive any orders for more than a year. Its bet for the future, the 747, was delayed in production by three months because of problems with its Pratt & Whitney engines. Then in March 1971, Congress voted to discontinue funding for the development of the Boeing 2707 supersonic transport (SST), the US's answer to the British-French Concorde, forcing the end of the project.

Commercial Airplane Group, by far the largest unit of Boeing, went from 83,700 employees in 1968 to 20,750 in 1971. Each unemployed Boeing employee cost at least one other job in the Seattle area, and unemployment rose to 14%, the highest in the United States. Housing vacancy rates rose to 16% from 1% in 1967. U-Haul dealerships ran out of trailers because so many people moved out. A billboard appeared near the airport:

Will the last person
leaving SEATTLE —
Turn out the lights.

In January 1970, the first 747, a four-engine long-range airliner, flew its first commercial flight with Pan American World Airways. The 747 changed the airline industry, providing much larger seating capacity than any other airliner in production. The company has delivered over 1,500 Boeing 747s. The 747 has undergone continuous improvements to keep it technologically up-to-date. Larger versions have also been developed by stretching the upper deck. The newest version of the 747, the 747-8, the final 747 was rolled out to Atlas Air in 2022.

Boeing launched three Jetfoil 929-100 hydrofoils that were acquired in 1975 for service in the Hawaiian Islands. When the service ended in 1979 the three hydrofoils were acquired by Far East Hydrofoil for service between Hong Kong and Macau.

During the 1970s, Boeing also developed the US Standard Light Rail Vehicle, which has been used in San Francisco, Boston, and Morgantown, West Virginia.

=== 1980s ===
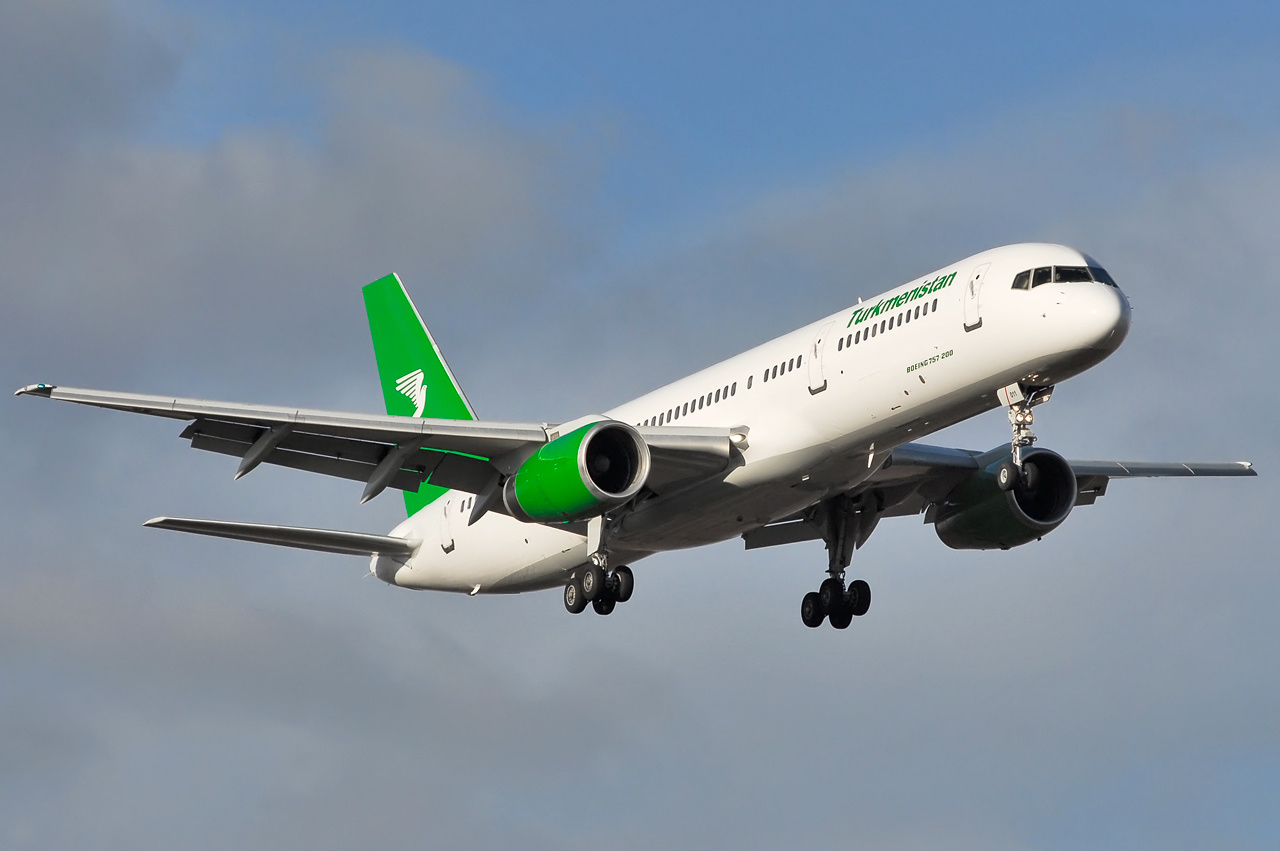
The narrow-body Boeing 757 replaced the 727. This example is in Turkmenistan Airlines livery.

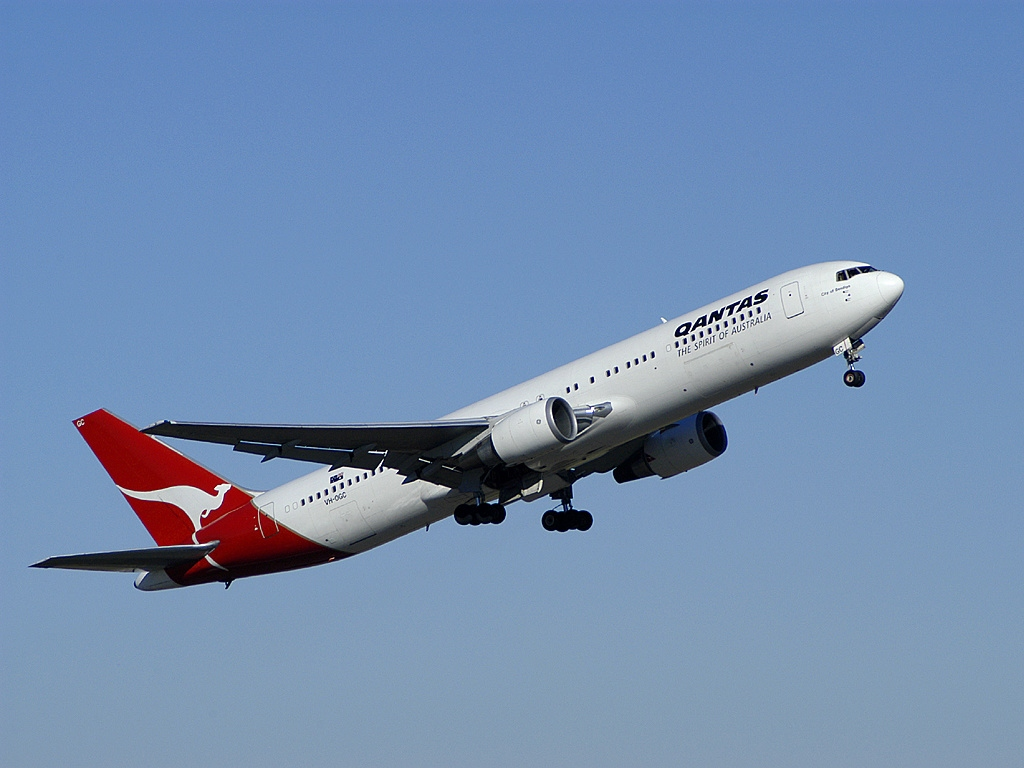
The Boeing 767 replaced the Boeing 707. This example is in Qantas livery.

In 1983, the economic situation began to improve. Boeing assembled its 1,000th 737 passenger aircraft. During the following years, commercial aircraft and their military versions became the basic equipment of airlines and air forces. As passenger air traffic increased, the competition was harder, mainly from Airbus, a European newcomer in commercial airliner manufacturing. Boeing had to offer new aircraft and developed the single-aisle 757, the larger, twin-aisle 767, and upgraded versions of the 737. An important project of these years was the Space Shuttle, to which Boeing contributed with its experience in space rockets acquired during the Apollo era. Boeing participated also with other products in the space program and was the first contractor for the International Space Station program.

During the decade several military projects went into production, including Boeing support of the B-2 stealth bomber. As part of an industry team led by Northrop, Boeing built the B-2's outer wing portion, aft center fuselage section, landing gear, fuel system, and weapons delivery system. At its peak in 1991, the B-2 was the largest military program at Boeing, employing about 10,000 people. The same year, the US's National Aeronautic Association awarded the B-2 design team the Collier Trophy for the greatest achievement in aerospace in America. The first B-2 rolled out of the bomber's final assembly facility in Palmdale, California, in November 1988 and it flew for the first time on July 17, 1989.

The Avenger air defense system and a new generation of short-range missiles also went into production. During these years, Boeing was very active in upgrading existing military equipment and developing new ones. Boeing also contributed to wind power development with the experimental MOD-2 Wind Turbines for NASA and the United States Department of Energy, and the MOD-5B for Hawaii.

=== 1990s ===
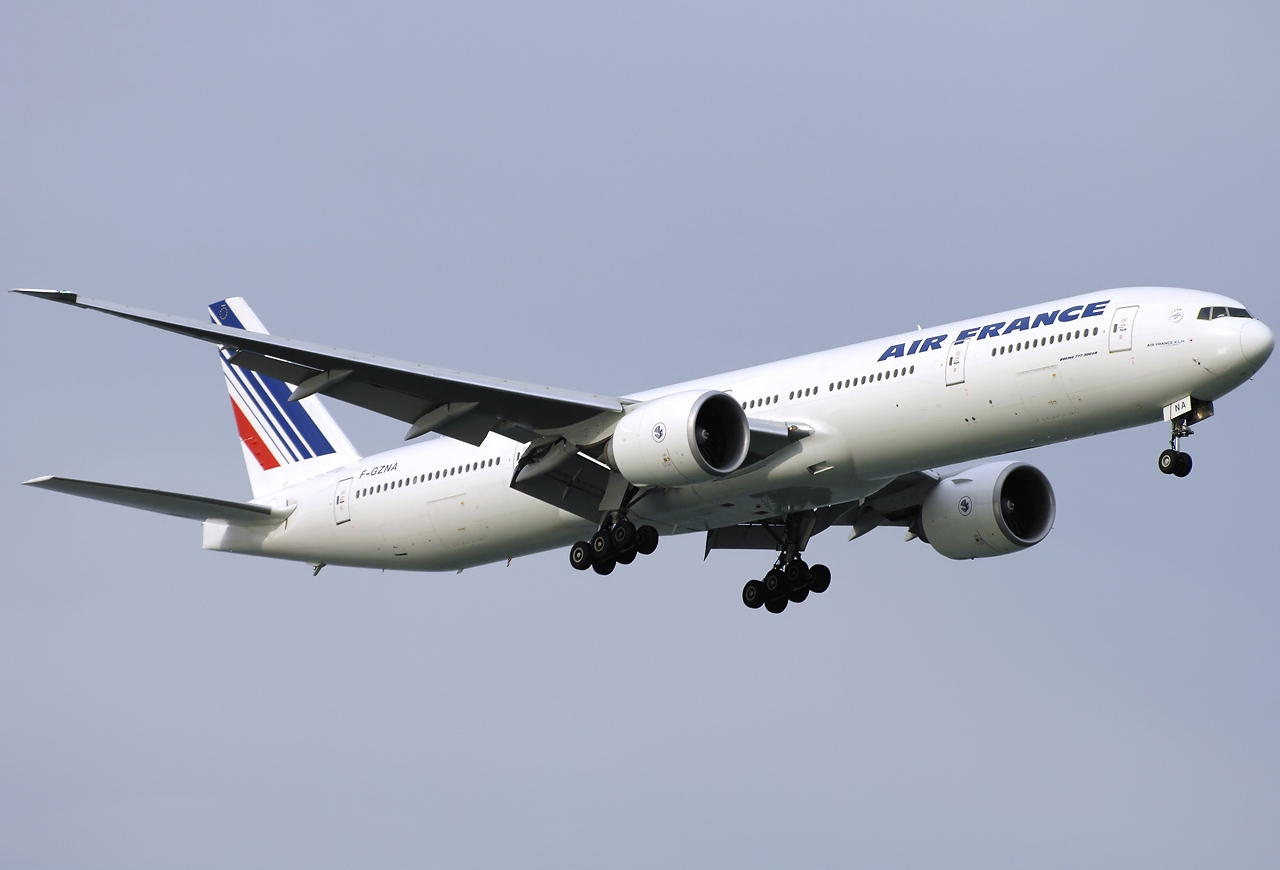
Air France 777-300ER

Boeing was one of seven competing companies that bid for the Advanced Tactical Fighter. Boeing agreed to team with General Dynamics and Lockheed so that all three companies would participate in the development if one of the three companies' designs was selected. The Lockheed design was eventually selected and developed into the F-22 Raptor.

In April 1994, Boeing introduced the most modern commercial jet aircraft at the time, the twin-engine 777, with a seating capacity of approximately 300 to 370 passengers in a typical three-class layout, in between the 767 and the 747. The longest range twin-engined aircraft in the world, the 777 was the first Boeing airliner to feature a "fly-by-wire" system and was conceived partly in response to the inroads being made by the European Airbus into Boeing's traditional market. This aircraft reached an important milestone by being the first airliner to be designed entirely by using computer-aided design (CAD) techniques. The 777 was also the first airplane to be certified for 180 minute ETOPS at entry into service by the FAA. Also in the mid-1990s, the company developed the revamped version of the 737, known as the 737 "Next-Generation", or 737NG. It has since become the fastest-selling version of the 737 in history, and on April 20, 2006, sales passed those of the "Classic 737", with a follow-up order for 79 aircraft from Southwest Airlines.

In 1995, Boeing chose to demolish the headquarters complex on East Marginal Way South instead of upgrading it to match new seismic standards. The headquarters were moved to an adjacent building and the facility was demolished in 1996. In 1997, Boeing was headquartered on East Marginal Way South, by King County Airport, in Seattle.

On December 5, 1996, Boeing announced its acquisition of Rockwell's aerospace and defense units. The Rockwell business units became a subsidiary of Boeing, named Boeing North American, Inc. Ten days later, Boeing announced its intention to merge with McDonnell Douglas and, following regulatory approval, this was completed on August 4, 1997. This had been delayed by objections from the European Commission, which ultimately placed 3 conditions on the merger: termination of exclusivity agreements with 3 US airlines, separate accounts would be maintained for the McDonnell-Douglas civil aircraft business, and some defense patents were to be made available to competitors. The New York Times made an observation described as prescient by Natasha Frost after the 737 Max crashes: "The full effect of the proposed merger on employees, communities, competitors, customers and investors will not be known for months, maybe even years."

Following the merger, the McDonnell Douglas MD-95 was renamed the Boeing 717, and the production of the MD-11 trijet was limited to the freighter version. Boeing introduced a new corporate identity with completion of the merger, incorporating the Boeing Stratotype wordmark introduced in 1947, and a stylized version of the McDonnell Douglas symbol, which was the adoption of the Douglas Aircraft logo from 1962. It was done by graphic designer Rick Eiber followed a request from Boeing.

An aerospace analyst criticized the CEO and his deputy, Philip M. Condit and Harry Stonecipher, for thinking of their personal benefits first, and causing the problems to Boeing many years later. Instead of investing the huge cash reserve to build new airplanes, they initiated a program to buy back Boeing stock for more than US$10 billion.

Natasha Frost said in Quartz that the 1997 merger paved the way for the Boeing 737 Max crash crisis, after a "clash of corporate cultures, where Boeing's engineers and McDonnell Douglas's bean-counters went head-to-head", which the smaller company won: "The resulting giant took Boeing's name. More unexpectedly, it took its culture and strategy from McDonnell Douglas".

In 2022 Rory Kennedy made a documentary film, Downfall: The Case Against Boeing, streamed by Netflix. She said about the 21st-century history of Boeing "There were many decades when Boeing did extraordinary things by focusing on excellence and safety and ingenuity. Those three virtues were seen as the key to profit. It could work, and beautifully. And then they were taken over by a group that decided Wall Street was the end-all, be-all. There needs to be a balance in play, so you have to elect representatives that hold the companies responsible for the public interest, rather than just lining their own pocketbooks."

In May 1999, Boeing studied buying Embraer to encourage commonality between the E-Jets and the Boeing 717, but this was nixed by then-president Harry Stonecipher. He preferred buying Bombardier Aerospace, but its owner, the Beaudoin family, asked for a price too high for Boeing which remembered its mid-1980s purchase of de Havilland Canada, losing a million dollars every day for three years before selling it to Bombardier in 1992. Boeing also completed the spin off of the civilian line of helicopters to form MD Helicopter Holdings Inc., it was become an indirect subsidiary of the Dutch RDM Holding Inc.

=== 2000–2009 ===
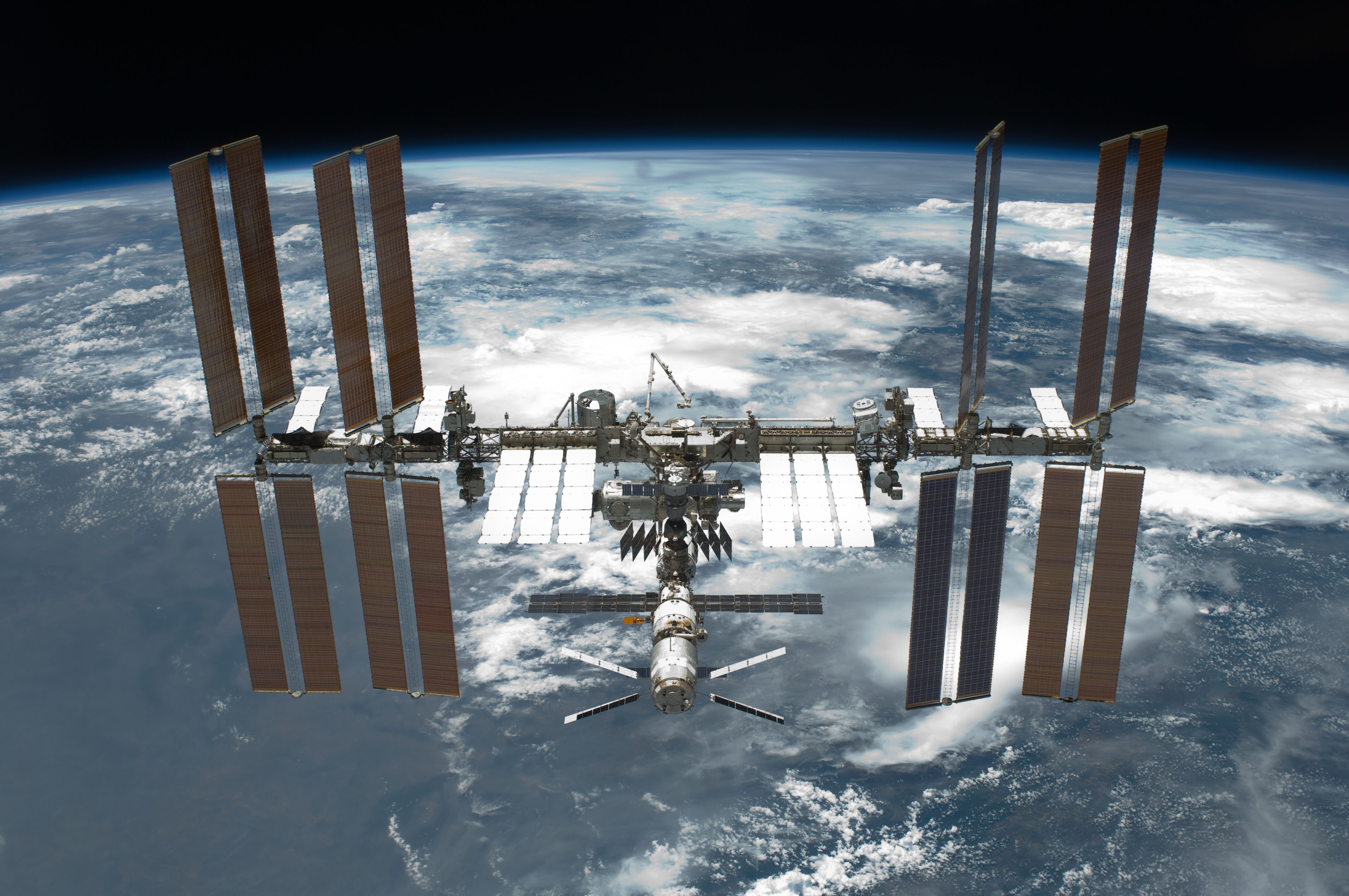
International Space Station

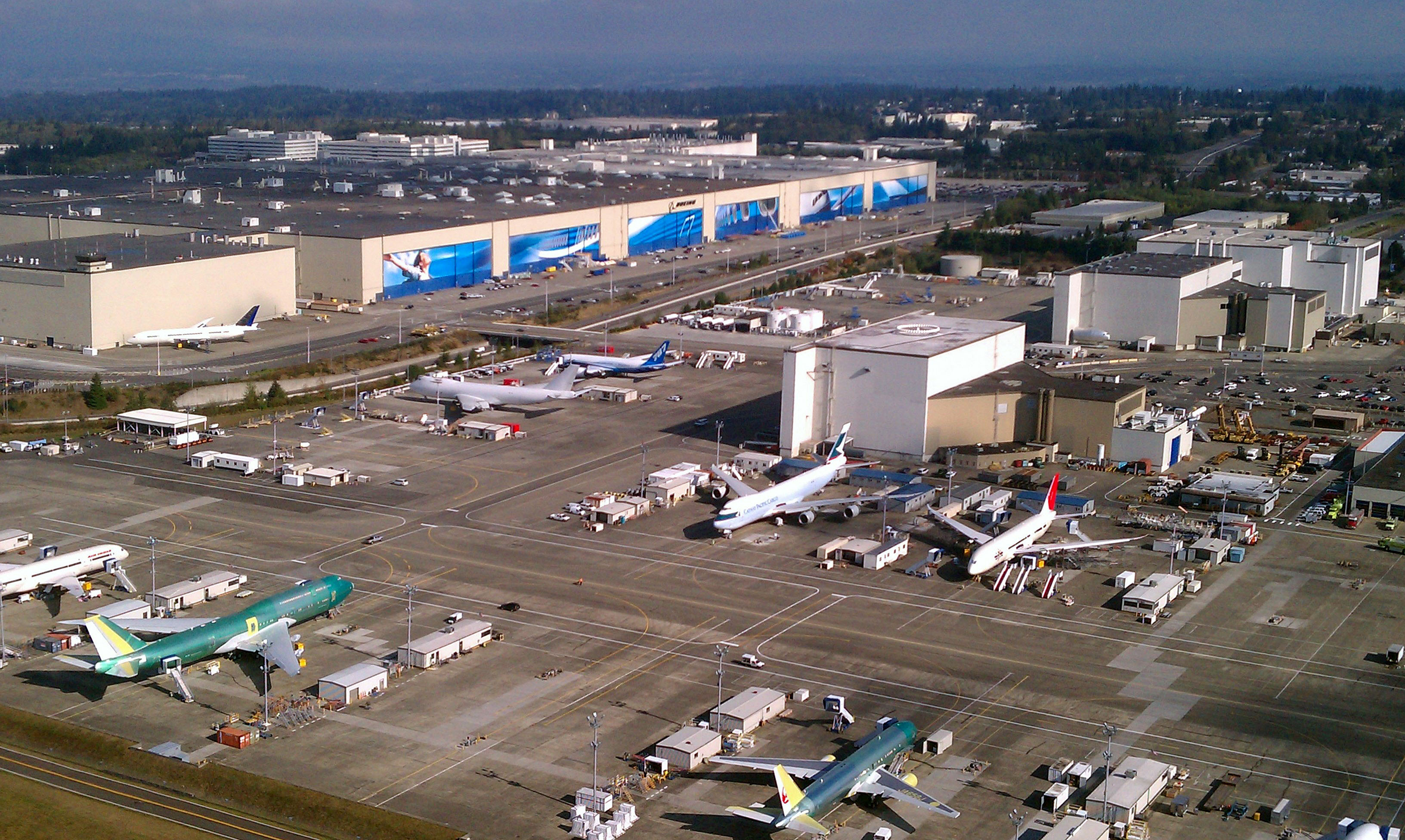
Boeing Everett Factory in 2011

In January 2000, Boeing chose to expand its presence in another aerospace field of satellite communications by purchasing satellite businesses from Hughes Electronics.

In March 2001, Boeing announced the pending relocation of its headquarters from Seattle to one of three cities: Chicago, Dallas, or Denver. All three had offered packages of multimillion-dollar tax breaks, and the selection of Chicago was announced on May 10; the move was completed in early September, just before 9/11. Its offices are located in the Fulton River District just outside the Chicago Loop.

On September 11, 2001, four Boeing planes were hijacked as part of the 9/11 attacks by nineteen men affiliated with terrorist organization Al-Qaeda. American Airlines Flight 11, a Boeing 767-200, crashed into the 1 WTC building of the original World Trade Center in New York City; United Airlines Flight 175, another 767-200, crashed into the 2 WTC building of the original WTC shortly after. American Airlines Flight 77, a Boeing 757-200 crashed into the Pentagon and United Airlines Flight 93, another 757-200, crashed in a rural Pennsylvanian community just outside of Pittsburgh. These flights were bound for parts of California.

In October 2001, Boeing lost to its rival Lockheed Martin in the fierce competition for the multibillion-dollar Joint Strike Fighter contract. Boeing's entry, the X-32, was rejected in favor of Lockheed's X-35. Boeing continues to serve as the prime contractor on the International Space Station and has built several of the major components.

Boeing began development of the KC-767 aerial refueling tanker in the early 2000s. Italy and Japan ordered four KC-767s each. After development delays and FAA certification, Boeing delivered the tankers to Japan from 2008 with the second KC-767 following on March 5. to 2010. Italy received its four KC-767 during 2011.

In 2004, Boeing ended production of the 757 after 1,050 aircraft were produced. More advanced stretched versions of the 737 were beginning to compete against the 757, and the planned 787-3 was to fill much of the top end of the 757 markets. Also that year, Boeing announced that the 717, the last civil aircraft to be designed by McDonnell Douglas, would cease production in 2006. The 767 was in danger of cancellation as well, with the 787 replacing it, but orders for the freighter version extended the program.

After several decades of success, Boeing lost ground to Airbus and subsequently lost its lead in the airliner market in 2003. Multiple Boeing projects were pursued and then canceled, notably the Sonic Cruiser, a proposed jetliner that would travel just under the speed of sound, cutting intercontinental travel times by as much as 20%. It was launched in 2001 along with a new advertising campaign to promote the company's new motto, "Forever New Frontiers", and to rehabilitate its image. However, the plane's fate was sealed by the changes in the commercial aviation market following the September 11 attacks and the subsequent weak economy and an increase in fuel prices.

Subsequently, Boeing streamlined its production and turned its attention to a new model, the Boeing 787 Dreamliner, using much of the technology developed for the Sonic Cruiser, but in a more conventional aircraft designed for maximum efficiency. The company also launched new variants of its successful 737 and 777 models. The 787 proved to be a highly popular choice with airlines and won a record number of pre-launch orders. With delays to Airbus' A380 program several airlines threatened to switch their A380 orders to Boeing's new 747 version, the 747-8. Airbus's response to the 787, the A350, received a lukewarm response at first when it was announced as an improved version of the A330, and then gained significant orders when Airbus promised an entirely new design. The 787 program encountered delays, with the first flight not occurring until late 2009.

After regulatory approval, Boeing formed a joint venture, United Launch Alliance with its competitor, Lockheed Martin, on December 1, 2006. The new venture is the largest provider of rocket launch services to the U.S. government.

In 2005, Gary Scott, ex-Boeing executive and then head of Bombardier's CSeries program, suggested a collaboration on the upcoming CSeries, but an internal study assessed Embraer as the best partner for regional jets. The Brazilian government wanted to retain control and blocked an acquisition.

On August 2, 2005, Boeing sold its Rocketdyne rocket engine division to Pratt & Whitney. On May 1, 2006, Boeing agreed to purchase Dallas, Texas-based Aviall, Inc. for $1.7 billion and retain $350 million in debt. Aviall, Inc. and its subsidiaries, Aviall Services, Inc. and ILS formed a wholly owned subsidiary of Boeing Commercial Aviation Services (BCAS).

Realizing that increasing numbers of passengers have become reliant on their computers to stay in touch, Boeing introduced Connexion by Boeing, a satellite-based Internet connectivity service that promised air travelers unprecedented access to the World Wide Web. The company debuted the product to journalists in 2005, receiving generally favorable reviews. However, facing competition from cheaper options, such as cellular networks, it proved too difficult to sell to most airlines. In August 2006, after a short and unsuccessful search for a buyer for the business, Boeing chose to discontinue the service.

On August 18, 2007, NASA selected Boeing as the manufacturing contractor for the liquid-fueled upper stage of the Ares I rocket. The stage, based on both Apollo-Saturn and Space Shuttle technologies, was to be constructed at NASA's Michoud Assembly Facility near New Orleans; Boeing constructed the S-IC stage of the Saturn V rocket at this site in the 1960s.

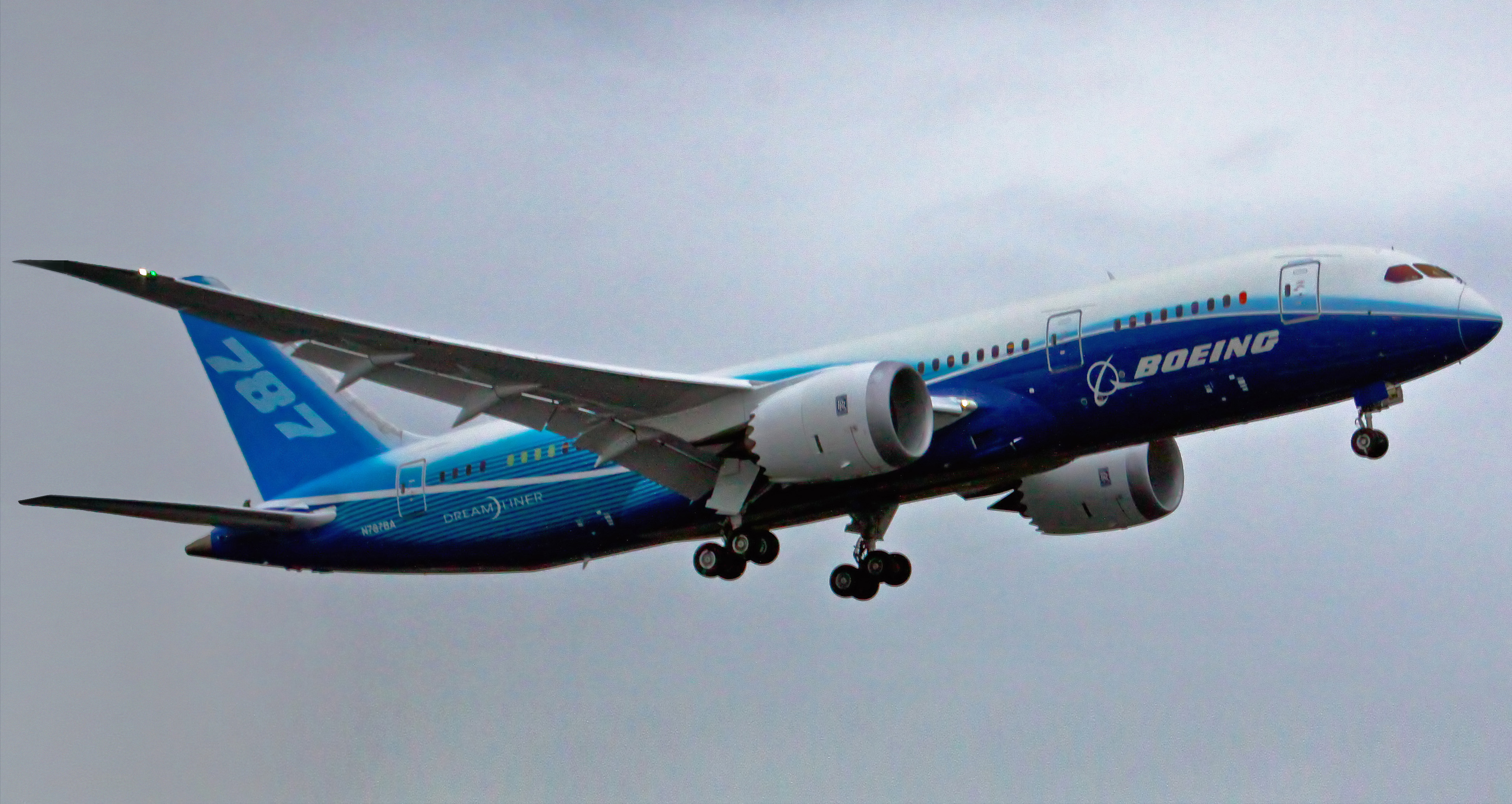
The Boeing 787 Dreamliner on its first flight

Boeing launched the 777 Freighter in May 2005 with an order from Air France. The freighter variant is based on the −200LR. Other customers include FedEx and Emirates. Boeing officially announced in November 2005 that it would produce a larger variant of the 747, the 747-8, in two versions, commencing with the Freighter version with firm orders for two cargo carriers. The second version, named the Intercontinental, is for passenger airlines. Both 747-8 versions feature a lengthened fuselage, new, advanced engines and wings, and the incorporation of other technologies developed for the 787.

Boeing also received the launch contract from the U.S. Navy for the P-8 Poseidon Multimission Maritime Aircraft, an anti-submarine warfare patrol aircraft. It has also received orders for the 737 AEW&C "Wedgetail" aircraft. The company has also introduced new extended range versions of the 737. These include the 737-700ER and 737-900ER. The 737-900ER is the latest and will extend the range of the 737-900 to a similar range as the successful 737-800 with the capability to fly more passengers, due to the addition of two extra emergency exits.

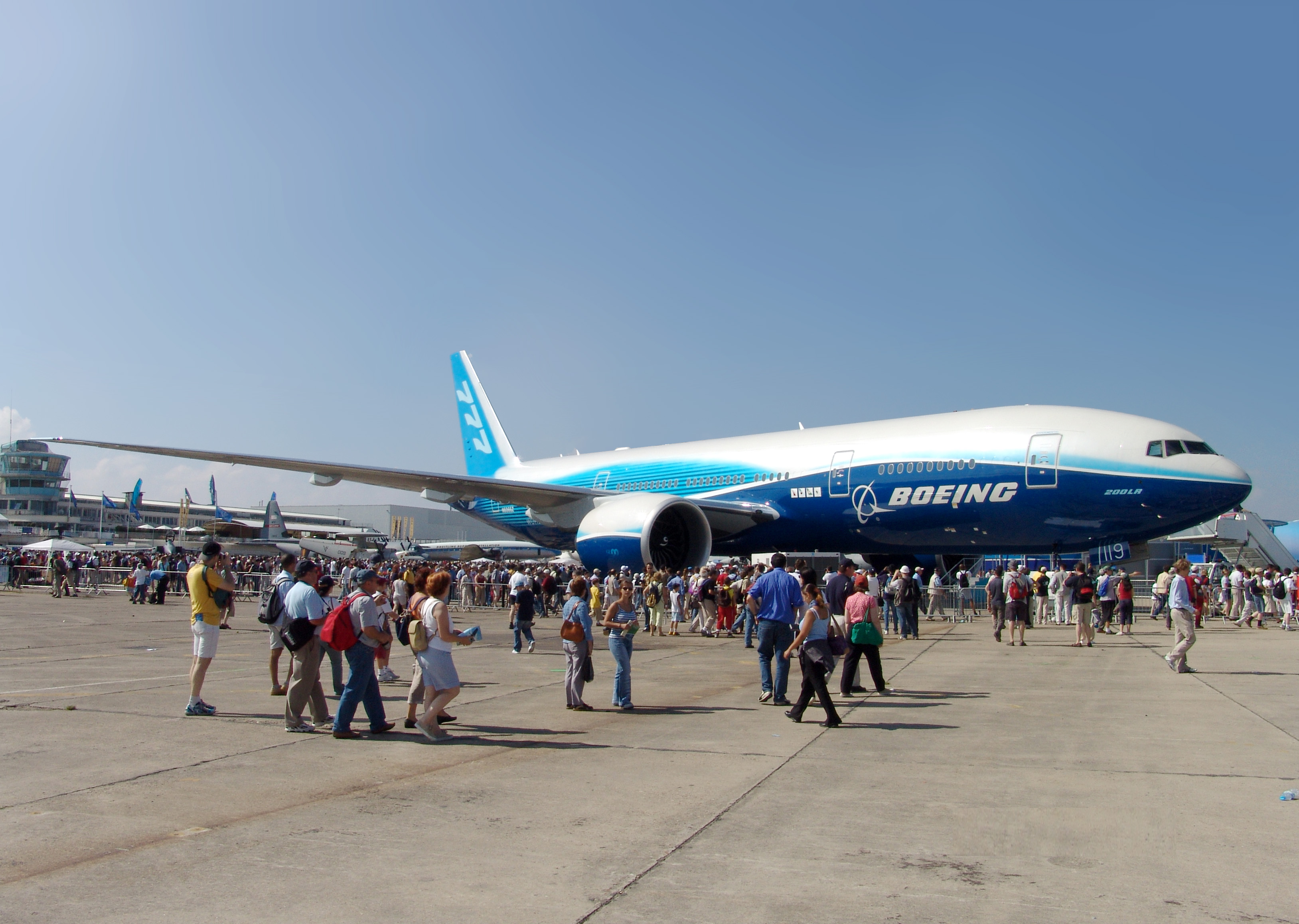
The record-breaking 777-200LR Worldliner, presented at the Paris Air Show 2005.

The 777-200LR Worldliner embarked on a well-received global demonstration tour in the second half of 2005, showing off its capacity to fly farther than any other commercial aircraft. On November 10, 2005, the 777-200LR set a world record for the longest non-stop flight. The plane, which departed from Hong Kong traveling to London, took a longer route, which included flying over the U.S. It flew 11,664 nautical miles (21,601 km) during its 22-hour 42-minute flight. It was flown by Pakistan International Airlines pilots and PIA was the first airline to fly the 777-200LR Worldliner.

On August 11, 2006, Boeing agreed to form a joint-venture with the large Russian titanium producer, VSMPO-Avisma for the machining of titanium forgings. The forgings will be used on the 787 program. In December 2007, Boeing and VSMPO-Avisma created a joint venture, Ural Boeing Manufacturing, and signed a contract on titanium product deliveries until 2015, with Boeing planning to invest $27 billion in Russia over the next 30 years.

In February 2011, Boeing received a contract for 179 KC-46 U.S. Air Force tankers at a value of $35 billion. The KC-46 tankers are based on the KC-767.

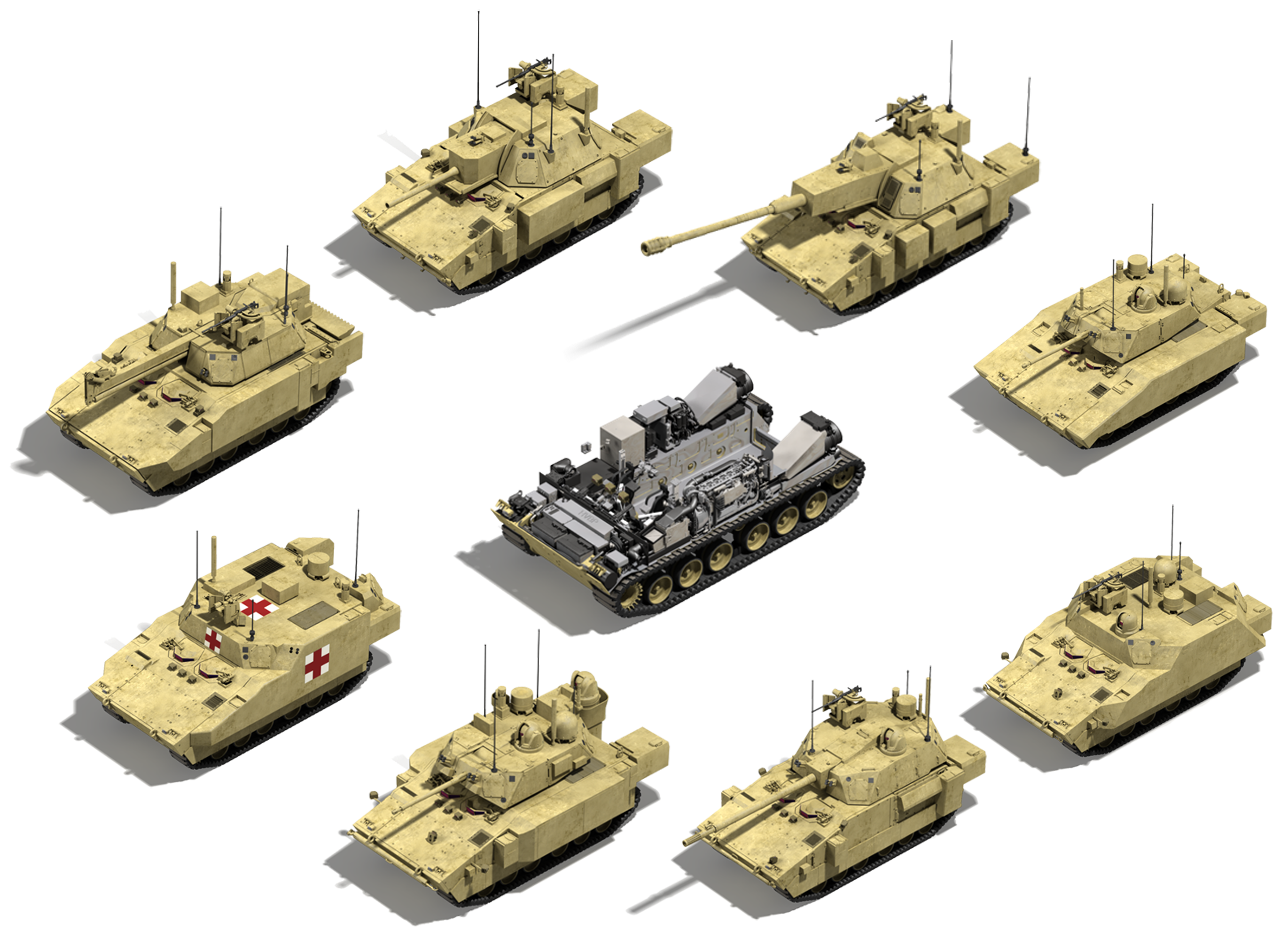
Graphic representation of the Future Combat Systems Manned Ground Vehicles

Boeing, along with Science Applications International Corporation (SAIC), were the prime contractors in the U.S. military's Future Combat Systems program. The FCS program was canceled in June 2009 with all remaining systems swept into the BCT Modernization program. Boeing works jointly with SAIC in the BCT Modernization program like the FCS program but the U.S. Army will play a greater role in creating baseline vehicles and will only contract others for accessories.

Defense Secretary Robert M. Gates' shift in defense spending to, "make tough choices about specific systems and defense priorities based solely on the national interest and then stick to those decisions over time" hit Boeing especially hard, because of their heavy involvement with canceled Air Force projects.

==== Unethical conduct ====
In May 2003, the U.S. Air Force announced it would lease 100 KC-767 tankers to replace the oldest 136 KC-135s. In November 2003, responding to critics who argued that the lease was more expensive than an outright purchase, the DoD announced a revised lease of 20 aircraft and a purchase of 80. In December 2003, the Pentagon announced the project was to be frozen while an investigation of allegations of corruption by one of its former procurement staffers, Darleen Druyun (who began employment at Boeing in January) was begun. The fallout of this resulted in the resignation of Boeing CEO Philip M. Condit and the termination of CFO Michael M. Sears. Harry Stonecipher, former McDonnell Douglas CEO and Boeing COO, replaced Condit on an interim basis. Druyun pleaded guilty to inflating the price of the contract to favor her future employer and to passing information on the competing Airbus A330 MRTT bid. In October 2004, she received a sentence of nine months in federal prison, seven months in a community facility, and three years probation.

In March 2005, the Boeing board forced President and CEO Harry Stonecipher to resign. Boeing said an internal investigation revealed a "consensual" relationship between Stonecipher and a female executive that was "inconsistent with Boeing's Code of Conduct" and "would impair his ability to lead the company". James A. Bell served as interim CEO (in addition to his normal duties as Boeing's CFO) until the appointment of Jim McNerney as the new Chairman, President, and CEO on June 30, 2005.

==== Industrial espionage ====
In June 2003, Lockheed Martin sued Boeing, alleging that the company had resorted to industrial espionage in 1998 to win the Evolved Expendable Launch Vehicle (EELV) competition. Lockheed Martin claimed that the former employee Kenneth Branch, who went to work for McDonnell Douglas and Boeing, passed nearly 30,000 pages of proprietary documents to his new employers. Lockheed Martin argued that these documents allowed Boeing to win 19 of the 28 tendered military satellite launches.

In July 2003, Boeing was penalized, with the Pentagon stripping seven launches away from the company and awarding them to Lockheed Martin. Furthermore, the company was forbidden to bid for rocket contracts for a twenty-month period, which expired in March 2005. In early September 2005, it was reported that Boeing was negotiating a settlement with the U.S. Department of Justice in which it would pay up to $500 million to cover this and the Darleen Druyun scandal.

In July 2009, naturalized citizen Dongfan Chung, an engineer working with Boeing, was the first person convicted under the Economic Espionage Act of 1996. Chung is suspected of having passed to China classified information on designs including the Delta IV rocket, F-15 Eagle, B-52 Stratofortress and the CH-46 and CH-47 helicopters.

=== 1992 EC-US Agreement notes ===
Until the late 1970s, the U.S. had a near monopoly in the Large Civil Aircraft (LCA) sector. The Airbus consortium (created in 1969) started competing effectively in the 1980s. At that stage the U.S. became concerned about European competition and the alleged subsidies paid by the European governments for the developments of the early models of the Airbus family. This became a major issue of contention, as the European side was equally concerned by subsidies accruing to U.S. LCA manufacturers through NASA and Defense programs.

Europe and the U.S. started bilateral negotiations for the limitation of government subsidies to the LCA sector in the late 1980s. Negotiations were concluded in 1992 with the signing of the EC-US Agreement on Trade in Large Civil Aircraft which imposes disciplines on government support on both sides of the Atlantic which are significantly stricter than the relevant World Trade Organization (WTO) rules: Notably, the Agreement regulates in detail the forms and limits of government support, prescribes transparency obligations and commits the parties to avoiding trade disputes.

==== Subsidy disputes ====
In 2004, the EU and the U.S. agreed to discuss a possible revision of the 1992 EC-US Agreement provided that this would cover all forms of subsidies including those used in the U.S., and in particular the subsidies for the Boeing 787; the first new aircraft to be launched by Boeing for 14 years. In October 2004 the U.S. began legal proceedings at the WTO by requesting WTO consultations on European launch investment to Airbus. The U.S. also unilaterally withdrew from the 1992 EU-US Agreement. The U.S. claimed Airbus had violated a 1992 bilateral accord when it received what Boeing deemed "unfair" subsidies from several European governments. Airbus responded by filing a separate complaint, contesting that Boeing had also violated the accord when it received tax breaks from the U.S. Government. Moreover, the EU also complained that the investment subsidies from Japanese airlines violated the accord.

On January 11, 2005, Boeing and Airbus agreed that they would attempt to find a solution to the dispute outside of the WTO. However, in June 2005, Boeing and the United States government reopened the trade dispute with the WTO, claiming that Airbus had received illegal subsidies from European governments. Airbus has also responded to this claim against Boeing, reopening the dispute and also accusing Boeing of receiving subsidies from the U.S. Government.

On September 15, 2010, the WTO ruled that Boeing had received billions of dollars in government subsidies. Boeing responded by stating that the ruling was a fraction of the size of the ruling against Airbus and that it required few changes in its operations. Boeing has received $8.7 billion in support from Washington state.

=== 2010–2016 ===
In summer 2010, Boeing acquired Fairfax, VA-based C4ISR and combat systems developer Argon ST to expand its C4ISR, cyber and intelligence capabilities.

In 2011, Boeing was hesitating between re-engining the 737 or developing an all-new small airplane for which Embraer could have been involved, but the Airbus A320neo launch, with new engines, precipitated the 737 MAX decision. On November 17, Boeing received its largest provisional order for $21.7 billion at list prices from Indonesian LCC Lion Air for 201 737 MAX, 29 737-900ERs and 150 purchase rights, days after its previous order record of $18 billion for 50 777-300ER from Emirates.

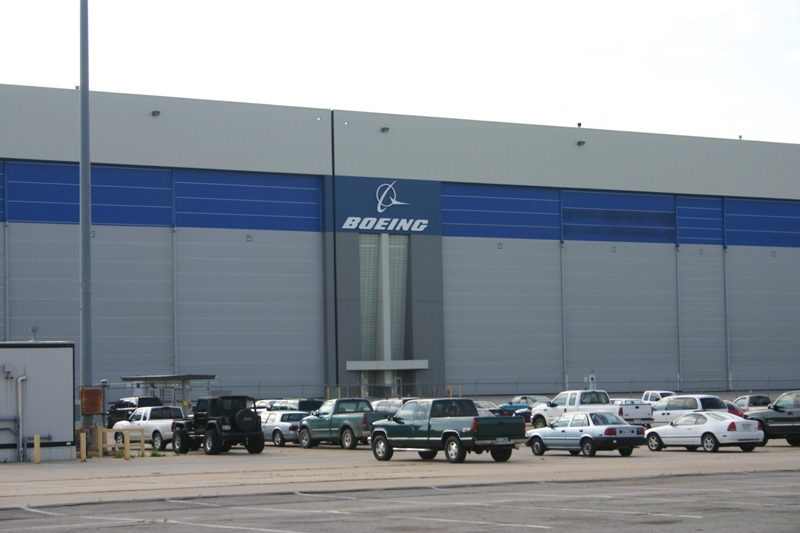
In 2012, Boeing announced it would close its facility in Wichita, Kansas (pictured).

On January 5, 2012, Boeing announced it would close its facilities in Wichita, Kansas with 2,160 workers before 2014, more than 80 years after it was established, where it had employed as many as 40,000 people.

In May 2013, Boeing announced it would cut 1,500 IT jobs in Seattle over the next three years, with 600 jobs relocating to St. Louis, the same number to North Charleston, South Carolina, and the remainder eliminated through layoffs and attrition. In September, Boeing announced their Long Beach facility manufacturing the C-17 Globemaster III military transport would shut down.

In January 2014, the company announced US$1.23 billion profits for Q4 2013, a 26% increase, due to higher demand for commercial aircraft. The last plane to undergo maintenance in Boeing Wichita's facility left in May 2014.

In September 2014, NASA awarded contracts to Boeing and SpaceX for transporting astronauts to the International Space Station.

In June 2015, Boeing announced that James McNerney would step down as CEO to be replaced by Boeing's COO, Dennis Muilenburg, on July 1, 2015. The 279th and last C-17 was delivered in summer before closing the site, affecting 2,200 jobs. Also in 2015, Boeing reportedly started the studies of the 797/NMA, after revealing that its own 757 would be replaced rather than re-engined.

In February 2016, Boeing announced that Boeing President and CEO Dennis Muilenburg was elected the 10th Chairman of the Board, succeeding James McNerney. In March, Boeing announced plans to cut 4,000 jobs from its commercial airplane division by mid-year. On May 13, 2016, Boeing opened a $1 billion, 27-acre (11-hectare) factory in Washington state to make carbon-composite wings for the Boeing 777X, to be delivered from 2020.

==== CSeries dumping petition ====
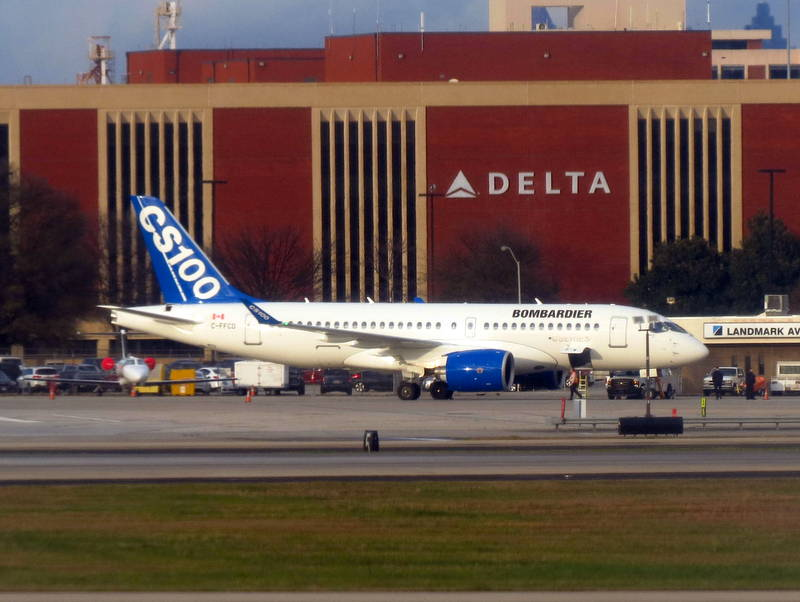
The CSeries CS100 demonstrated for Delta Air Lines in Atlanta

On 28 April 2016, Bombardier Aerospace recorded a firm order from Delta Air Lines for 75 CSeries CS100s plus 50 options. On 27 April 2017, The Boeing Company filed a petition for dumping them at $19.6m each, below their $33.2m production cost. On the same day, both Bombardier and the government of Canada rejected Boeing's claim, vowing to mount a "vigorous defence".

On 9 June 2017, the US International Trade Commission (USITC) found that the US industry could be threatened and should be protected. On 26 September, after lobbying by Boeing, the US Department of Commerce (DoC) alleged subsidies of 220% and intended to collect deposits accordingly, plus a preliminary 80% anti-dumping duty, resulting in a duty of 300%. The DoC announced its final ruling, a total duty of 292%, on 20 December, hailing it as an affirmation of the "America First" policy. In October, with financial issues already mounting, Bombardier was indirectly forced by the US government tariffs to relinquish 50.01% of its stake in the CSeries program to Airbus for a symbolic CAD$1, and would produce CSeries aircraft in the United States.

On 10 January 2018, Canada formally filed a complaint at the World Trade Organization (WTO) against the United States over the affair. On 26 January, the four USITC commissioners unanimously reversed their earlier claims, finding that US industry is no longer threatened and no duty orders will be issued, overturning the imposed duties. The Commission public report was made available by February 2018. On March 22, Boeing declined to appeal the ruling.

=== 2017–present ===
In October 2017, Boeing announced plans to acquire Aurora Flight Sciences to expand its capabilities to develop autonomous, electric-powered and long-flight-duration aircraft for its commercial and military businesses, pending regulatory approval.

In 2017, Boeing won 912 net orders for $134.8 billion at list prices including 745 737s, 94 787s and 60 777s, and delivered 763 airliners including 529 737s, 136 787s and 74 777s.

In January 2018, a joint venture was formed by auto seat maker Adient (50.01%) and Boeing (49.99%) to develop and manufacture airliner seats for new installations or retrofit, a $4.5 billion market in 2017 which will grow to $6 billion by 2026, to be based in Kaiserslautern near Frankfurt and distributed by Boeing subsidiary Aviall, with its customer service center in Seattle.

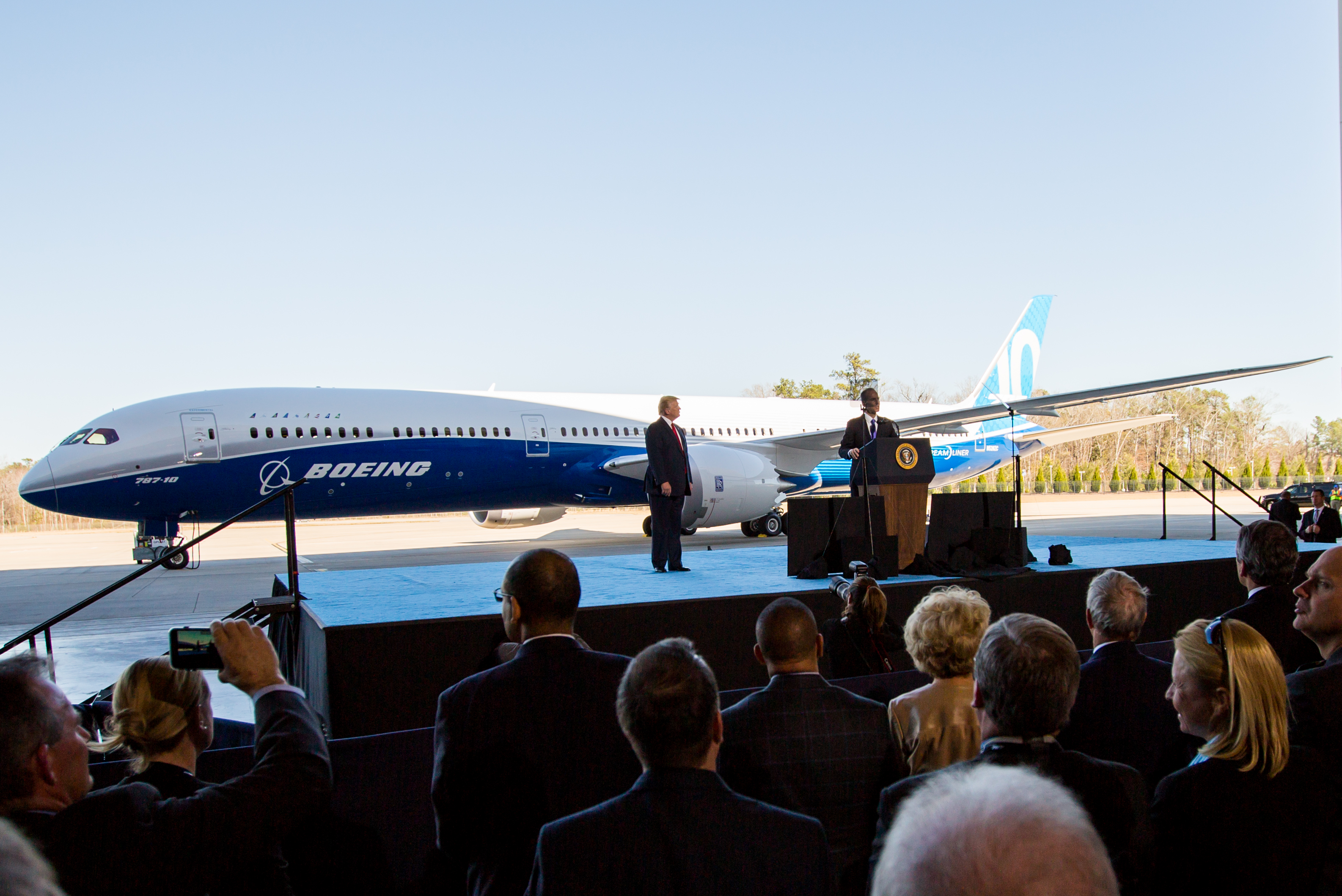
Boeing CEO Dennis Muilenburg and President Trump at the 787-10 Dreamliner rollout ceremony

On June 4, 2018, Boeing and Safran announced a 50-50 partnership to design, build and service auxiliary power units (APU) after regulatory and antitrust clearance in the second half of 2018. This could threaten the dominance of Honeywell and United Technologies in the APU market.

At a June 2018 AIAA conference, Boeing unveiled a hypersonic transport project.

On July 5, 2018, Boeing and Embraer announced a joint venture, covering Embraer's airliner business. This is seen as a reaction to Airbus acquiring a majority of the competing Bombardier CSeries on October 16, 2017.

In September 2018, Boeing signed a deal with the Pentagon worth up to $2.4 billion to provide helicopters for protecting nuclear-missile bases. Boeing acquired the satellite company Millennium Space System in September 2018.

==== MAX groundings, pandemic ====
On March 10, 2019, an Ethiopian Airlines Boeing 737 MAX 8 crashed just minutes after take-off from Addis Ababa. Initial reports noted similarities with the crash of a Lion Air MAX 8 in October 2018. In the following days, numerous countries and airlines grounded all 737 MAX aircraft. On March 13, the FAA became the last major authority to ground the aircraft, reversing its previous stance that the MAX was safe to fly. On March 19, the U.S. Department of Transportation requested an audit of the regulatory process that led to the aircraft's certification in 2017, amid concerns that current U.S. rules allow manufacturers to largely "self-certify" aircraft. During March 2019 Boeing's share price dropped significantly. In May 2019 Boeing admitted that it had known of issues with the 737 MAX before the second crash, and only informed the Federal Aviation Authority of the software issue a month after the Lion Air crash.

On April 23, 2019, the Wall Street Journal reported that Boeing, SSL and aerospace company The Carlyle Group had been helping the Chinese Peoples Liberation Army enable its mass surveillance on ethnic groups such as the Uighur Muslims in the Xinjiang autonomous region in northwestern China as well as giving a high-speed internet access to the artificial islands in the South China sea among others through the use of new satellites. The companies have been selling the new satellites to a Chinese company called AsiaSat which is a joint-venture between the Carlyle Group and the Chinese State-owned CITIC which then sells space on these satellites to Chinese companies. The companies stated that they never specifically intended for their technology to be used by China's Ministry of Public Security and the Police.

On July 18, 2019, when presenting its second-quarter results, Boeing announced that it had recorded a $4.9 billion after-tax charge corresponding to its initial estimate of the cost of compensation to airlines for the 737 MAX groundings, but not the cost of lawsuits, potential fines, or the less tangible cost to its reputation. It also noted a $1.7 billion rise in estimated MAX production costs, primarily due to higher costs associated with the reduced production rate.

On November 18, 2019, Boeing (49%) and Embraer (51%) announced a joint venture to market the C-390 Millennium tactical transport aircraft, called Boeing Embraer – Defense, to operate after the regulatory approvals and closing conditions.

The joint ventures with Embraer, for commercial and military aircraft, were both canceled in April 2020, as Boeing was heavily affected financially by the grounding of the 737 MAX and the impact of the 2019–20 coronavirus pandemic on aviation. Boeing claimed that Embraer had failed to meet required conditions by April 24, while Embraer accused Boeing of manufacturing "false claims" in order to avoid its commitments, and stated that it would pursue "all remedies against Boeing for the damages incurred". The Master Teaming Agreement for marketing of the C-390 continued, though the prospects of international sales facilitated by Boeing diminished.

In late April 2020, due to the 737 MAX grounding, Boeing left behind studies for the New Midsized Airplane/797 in favor of refreshments of its geriatric 757 and 767, alternatively called the 757-Plus and 767X. In May 2020, the company cut 12,000 jobs due to the drop in air travel during the COVID-19 pandemic. In July 2020, Boeing reported a loss of $2.4 billion as a result of the pandemic and grounding of the 737 MAX aircraft. As a result of the profit loss, the company announced that it is planning to do more job and production cuts.

Boeing has suspended support of the Russian market operating its products since 2022.

On May 5, 2022, Boeing announced that it would be moving its global headquarters from Chicago to Arlington, Virginia, which is a suburb of Washington, D.C. It also stated that it plans to add a research and technology center in Northern Virginia. The company said that this decision was made in part due to the region's "proximity to our customers and stakeholders, and its access to world-class engineering and technical talent."

In December 2022, the last Boeing 747 aircraft rolled off the production line at the Everett factory. It will be delivered to Atlas Air. A number of other airlines have already stopped using the Boeing 747. The Boeing 747 shared its fate with the Airbus A380, the only other double deck aircraft that also phased out production shortly before in 2021.

In May 2023, Boeing finished acquisition of autonomous eVTOL air taxi startup Wisk Aero. The company was started from the partnership between Kitty Hawk and Boeing in June 2019 for developing Cora electric aircraft, and spun off from Kitty Hawk in December. This was later sold to Archer Aviation in August 2026.

=== Alaska Airlines 1282 incident ===
On January 5, 2024 a Boeing 737 MAX 9 operating as Alaska Airlines Flight 1282 suffered an uncontrolled decompression after a door plug blew out from the aircraft shortly after takeoff from PDX. The aircraft returned safely to Portland with 3 passengers suffering minor injuries and no fatalities. The MAX 9 aircraft features optional rear mid-cabin emergency exit doors to meet regulatory requirements for evacuation speed on aircraft configured with more than 189 seats. On MAX 9 aircraft with less dense configurations, these emergency exit doors are optional and are replaced with door plugs to save weight. During the subsequent investigation by the NTSB, it was discovered that during the manufacturing process the door plug had been temporarily removed in order to repair 5 damaged rivets that were noticed on the fuselage. Upon re-installment the 4 retaining bolts that typically secure the door were not replaced, leading to the door plug not being properly secured to the fuselage. In the wake of the accident, the FAA issued an Emergency Airworthiness Directive grounding all MAX 9 aircraft with a mid-cabin door plug configuration, pending an inspection of the plug and retaining bolts securing it. On January 9, Boeing's president and CEO, Dave Calhoun acknowledged the company's mistake in a company-wide meeting on safety and transparency following the accident. The company pledged for full transparency and cooperation in the investigation with the NTSB and FAA. In an interview with CNBC on January 10, Dave Calhoun described it as a quality control issue and said that a "quality escape" had occurred. That same day the FAA notified Boeing that it was under investigation for "alleged noncompliance" with regulations relating to new aircraft inspection and testing.

=== Future concepts ===
In May 2006, four concept designs being examined by Boeing were outlined in The Seattle Times based on corporate internal documents. The research aims in two directions: low-cost airplanes, and environmental-friendly planes. Codenamed after some of The Muppets characters, a design team known as the Green Team concentrated primarily on reducing fuel usage. All four designs illustrated rear-engine layouts.

- "Fozzie" employs open rotors and offers a lower cruising speed.
- "Beaker" has very thin, long wings, with the ability to partially fold-up to facilitate easier taxiing.
- "Kermit Kruiser" has forward swept wings over which are positioned its engines, with the aim of lowering noise below due to the reflection of the exhaust signature upward.
- "Honeydew" with its delta wing design, resembles a marriage of the flying wing concept and the traditional tube fuselage.

As with most concepts, these designs were only in the exploratory stage, intended to help Boeing evaluate the potentials of such radical technologies.

The Boeing Yellowstone Project was the company's project to replace its entire civil aircraft portfolio with advanced technology aircraft. The project was split into three different programs, intended to produce three new aircraft types. Y1 was ultimately cancelled as Boeing opted to instead re-engine the 737 airframe, eventually producing the 737 MAX family of jets. Y2 was developed into what eventually became the 787. Y3 became the 777X, the only Yellowstone project that has yet to be completed.

== Boeing Marines System ==
Boeing has designed and built several hydrofoil craft for both military and civilian use.

== Bibliography ==
- Boeing (2016). "Biography of William E. Boeing" (PDF). Boeing.
- Boeing (2020). "Boeing History Chronology" (PDF). Boeing.
- Haine, Edgar A. (2000). Disaster in the Air. Associated University Presses. ISBN 9780845347775. - Total pages: 394
