= National Legal and Policy Center =

American legal organization

Coordinates: 38.8830°N 77.1687°W

- Founded: 1991
- Type: Non-profit
- Location: Falls Church, Virginia
- Services: Advocacy, litigation, public education
- Chairman: Peter Flaherty
- Website: nlpc.org

The National Legal and Policy Center (NLPC) is a conservative 501(c)(3) non-profit group that monitors and reports on the ethics of public officials, supporters of liberal causes, and labor unions in the United States. The Center files complaints with government agencies, legally challenges what they view as abuse and corruption, and publishes reports. The NLPC is described as conservative in nature. The NLPC's current chairman is Peter Flaherty.

The NLPC was founded in 1991 following the release of the Senate Ethics Committee report into the Keating Five.

== Government Integrity Project ==
In early February 2004, NLPC filed complaints with the Federal Election Commission (FEC) for election law violations during Al Sharpton's run for the 2004 Democratic presidential nomination. A conciliation agreement made public by NLPC on April 19, 2009, described $509,188 in campaign-related expenses on Sharpton's American Express card. His campaign committee paid $121,996, leaving $385,192 in illegal payments from other sources, including $65,000 from unknown sources. NLPC Chairman Ken Boehm had accused Sharpton of running an "off the books" presidential campaign. Sharpton and his National Action Network (NAN) agreed to pay a $285,000 "civil penalty" for his campaign election law violations.

== Corporate Integrity Project ==
The Corporate Integrity Project has led campaigns against Boeing, CBS/Viacom, Fannie Mae, MCI/Worldcom, and Subway for practices ranging from large corporate scandals to anti-American campaigns. The scandals they have unearthed have led to the firing of Boeing CFO Michael M. Sears, the resignation of Boeing CEO Phil Condit, and prison terms in 2005 for both Darleen Druyun and Michael M. Sears.

== Lawsuit v. Clinton Healthcare Task Force ==
NLPC was a plaintiff in the successful 1993 lawsuit to open the meetings and records of Hillary Clinton's health care task force.

On February 24, 1993, Hillary Rodham Clinton and the six Cabinet members serving on the task force were sued under the Federal Advisory Committee Act (FACA) in U.S. District Court for the District of Columbia by NLPC, along with two other groups, the Association of American Physicians and Surgeons and the American Council for Health Care Reform. FACA requires government task forces to conduct its affairs in public if non-government employees, or "outsiders," take part.

On March 10, 1993, Judge Royce Lamberth ruled that the task force had to open its meetings to the plaintiffs and the media. Lamberth ruled that the "official" members of the task force, meaning the First Lady and the Cabinet Secretaries who comprised its membership, could not meet in secret because Clinton was not a government employee. But Lamberth also ruled that all the other people working on the plan, who were organized into "sub-groups," could continue to work in secret, because FACA was never meant to apply to staff.

Lamberth's ruling was appealed by the White House, and was overturned on June 22, 1993 after the task force had already disbanded on May 30. Justice Department lawyers argued that since Hillary Rodham Clinton "functions in both a legal and practical sense as part of the government," her participation in the task force should not trigger FACA. A three-judge panel of the U.S. Court of Appeals for the D.C. Circuit agreed.

According to Hillary Clinton, “It was a deft political move, designed to disrupt our work on health care and to foster the impression with the public and the news media that we were conducting ‘secret’ meetings.”

== FDA Commissioner David Kessler resignation ==
In 1996, NLPC exposed over-billing by then-FDA Commissioner David Kessler on his government expense reimbursements. Kessler resigned soon after. In his 2001 book A Question of Intent, Kessler wrote that NLPC “brought me as close to despair as I have ever been.”

== Boeing tanker deal scandal ==
On October 6, 2003, NLPC filed a formal Complaint with the Inspector General of the Department of Defense and the Defense Department Criminal Investigative Service, which was the basis for a front-page Wall Street Journal article the next day. The NLPC's complaint detailed how Defense Department procurement officer Darleen Druyun, while still at the Pentagon, sold her house to a Boeing executive who was also working on the tanker deal. The Complaint specifically raised the possibility that Druyun had negotiated employment with Boeing while still at the Pentagon. Federal law prohibits defense acquisition officials from discussing jobs with companies unless they recuse themselves from contract decisions involving those companies.

On November 24, 2003, Druyun and Boeing Chief Financial Officer Michael M. Sears were fired. One week later, Boeing Chief Executive Office Phil Condit resigned. On October 1, 2004, Druyun was sentenced to nine months in prison by U.S. District Judge T.S. Ellis in federal court in Alexandria, Virginia. On February 18, 2005, Sears was sentenced to four months in prison and fined $250,000 by U.S. District Court Judge Gerald Lee.

== Rep. Alan Mollohan ==
In 2006, NLPC filed a 500-page Complaint with the Justice Department alleging that Alan Mollohan’s financial disclosure forms contained omissions and misrepresentations that obscured a significant increase in his personal wealth at the time he earmarked more than $250 million to nonprofit groups in his district founded and controlled by business partners and campaign contributors. The Complaint triggered a four-year federal investigation and was the basis for a front-page Wall Street Journal story on April 6, 2006 by the late John R. Wilke that touched off a firestorm. The New York Times editorialized on April 12, 2006 that Mollohan’s “shady dealings” meant that he should resign from the House Ethics Committee, which he did on April 21, 2006.

On April 25, 2006, Wilke wrote another front-page Wall Street Journal story detailing how Mollohan had bought a farm with the CEO of a defense contractor for whose firm Mollohan had added funds to a spending bill. For this reporting, Wilke won the 2007 Everett McKinley Dirksen Award for Distinguished Reporting of Congress, awarded by the National Press Foundation.

The Complaint was also the basis for a May 17, 2006 New York Times article by Jodi Rudoren and Aron Pilhofer describing Mollohan’s undisclosed ownership of a Washington, D.C. condominium building known as The Remington. In an implicit admission of the disclosure failures uncovered by NLPC, Mollohan on June 14, 2006 amended six years of disclosure forms.

On January 26, 2010, the Justice Department announced that no charges would be filed against Mollohan. On May 11, 2010, Mollohan lost a Democratic primary to State Senator Mike Oliverio in a race where Mollohan’s ethics were the predominant issue. Mollohan had held the seat for 28 years.

In November 2014, Citizens for Responsibility and Ethics in Washington (CREW) received hundreds of pages of documents related to the Justice Department investigation in response to a Freedom of Information Act request. CREW’s executive director Melanie Sloan stated, “ It was clear the Justice Department should have indicted Mollohan.”

== GOP Mystery Donor ==
In 2012, NLPC provided the New York Times with information about James Robert Williams, who made almost $900,000 in political contributions to mostly Republican candidates. Williams had no visible means of support and lived in a small apartment in Queens. Following the July 28 front-page article, Williams dropped from sight.

== Auto Bailout and 2014 General Motors Recall ==
NLPC was a high-profile critic of the bailout of the auto industry by the United States government. NLPC’s spokesman was Mark Modica, a former Saturn dealer business manager and wiped-out GM bondholder. Following a demand by NLPC, General Motors in 2014 recalled 1.3 million vehicles with a steering loss defect uncovered by Modica.

== Senator Robert Menendez ==
Senator Robert Menendez (D-NJ) was indicted in April 2015, along with Dr. Salomon Melgen, his largest campaign contributor, partly on the basis of information made public by NLPC through a front-page New York Times story on February 1, 2013.

Melgen is a wealthy south Florida eye doctor and the charges related to Menendez’ attempts to derail a Medicare fraud investigation into Melgen’s practice and securing visas for three Melgen “girlfriends.” The indictment also alleged that Menendez pushed a port security deal in the Dominican Republic that would have provided a windfall for Melgen. The indictment alleges Melgen provided Menendez with private jet rides, Dominican vacations, and donations to his legal defense fund. Information on the port security deal was provided by NLPC to the Times.

The Justice Department chose not to retry Menendez after his trial ended in a mistrial on November 16, 2017. On August 8, 2018, NLPC filed a Freedom of Information Act request for documents pertaining to the prosecution and the decision not to retry Menendez. Then-NLPC Chairman Ken Boehm suggested that Menendez was the beneficiary of political influence.

== Rep. Maxine Waters ==
In 2018, NLPC filed two complaints against Rep. Maxine Waters (D-CA) with the Federal Election Commission. The complaints alleged campaign finance violations for using a slate mailer, a mass mailing supporting or opposing "a total of four or more candidates or ballot measures." One complaint cited a payment to her campaign fund from the Democratic State Central Committee of California (DSCCC) for the inclusion of Senate candidate Kamala Harris on Waters’ slate mailer. The Federal Election Commission dismissed the allegation, stating that "the payment on behalf of the Harris committee was a coordinated party expenditure within the [Political Reform] Acts’ limit."

The second complaint cited a payment to her campaign fund from a group called "Families and Teachers for Antonio" for inclusion of former Los Angeles mayor and California gubernatorial candidate Antonio Villaraigosa on the mailer. The Federal Election Commission used prosecutorial discretion to dismiss the allegation, stating that, although the Waters Committee had received an excessive contribution and returned the group’s payment exceeding the attributable costs of the mailer "beyond the 60-day regulatory timeframe," the amount in question had been modest.

== Constitutional Challenge to Mueller Authority ==
NLPC provided financial and logistical support to a constitutional challenge to Special Counsel Robert Mueller’s appointment and authority by Andrew Miller, a former aide to indicted GOP operative Roger Stone, who has subpoenaed in the case. Miller was represented by constitutional and appellate attorney Paul Kamenar, who worked on a partial pro bono basis. NLPC Chairman Peter Flaherty told the New York Times on June 28, 2018, “The founders feared exactly what we see in Mueller: a runaway federal official. We hope to see Mueller’s operation disbanded, once and for all.”

The challenge had its genesis in a May 13, 2018 Wall Street Journal op-ed by Northwestern Law Professor Steven Calabresi. He argued that Mueller’s appointment violated the Appointments Clause because Mueller was acting like a “principal officer” requiring presidential appointment and Senate confirmation, rather than as an “inferior officer.” Calabresi encouraged anyone charged or called as a witness by Mueller to challenge his appointment.

The challenge was initiated on June 28, 2018, when Kamenar filed a Motion to Quash the subpoena issued to appear before Mueller’s grand jury on the basis that Mueller’s appointment was unconstitutional. In the Motion to Quash, Kamenar made three principal arguments:

1. Congress did not authorize the appointment of a Special Counsel as an officer of the United States.
2. Mueller is a principal officer and should have been appointed by the President and confirmed by the U.S. Senate like all U.S. Attorneys.
3. If Mueller is an inferior officer as he claims, the Appointments Clause requires that he be appointed by the “head of the department,” which was Attorney General Jeff Sessions, not Deputy Attorney General Rod Rosenstein.

President Trump tweeted on several occasions about one of the central issues of the case, that Mueller was never confirmed by the Senate.

The challenge was first heard by Hon. Beryl Howell, the Chief Judge of the U.S. District Court for the District of Columbia on July 18, 2018. On August 2, 2018, Howell ruled against Miller, meaning Mueller could enforce the subpoena. On August 10, 2018, Miller refused to answer any Grand Jury questions and was held in Contempt of Court by Howell.

On August 13, 2018, Kamenar appealed Howell’s decision to the U.S. Court of Appeals for the District of Columbia. Oral arguments took place on November 8, 2018 before a three-judge panel. The hearing, which lasted well over an hour, took place against the backdrop of the resignation of Attorney General Jeff Sessions. Presiding was Judge Karen Henderson appointed by George H.W. Bush. The other two panelists were Sri Srinivasan, appointed by Obama, and Judith W. Rogers, appointed by Clinton.

Kamenar focused on Mueller’s “free rein” and told the Court, “The special counsel does exercise extraordinary prosecutorial and governmental powers. He can bring indictments in multiple jurisdictions. He’s like a U.S. attorney at-large. He can indict without consulting the acting attorney general.”

On February 26, 2019, the Court ruled against Miller, issuing an unexpectedly brief decision of only 16 pages after taking an unexpectedly long three months after the oral argument. On April 12, 2019 Kamenar filed a Motion for a rehearing before an en banc panel of all eleven judges of the Court. On April 29, 2019, the Court denied the request.

On May 6, 2019, Kamenar filed a Motion to stay the mandate against Miller, meaning that Miller would not have to testify until Kamenar could file an appeal with the Supreme Court. On May 21, the Appeals Court denied the Motion, and remanded the case to the District Court. Out of legal options to further forestall the subpoena, Miller agreed on May 29 to testify before the Mueller-convened grand jury, effectively ending the constitutional challenge. On May 31, Miller answered grand jury questions for two hours, and according to Kamenar, did not invoke his Fifth Amendment rights.

== Goldman Sachs DEI Criteria ==
On February 16, 2026, Goldman Sachs announced it would no longer use race, sexual orientation and other DEI factors when recruiting potential new directors. The decision was in response to a behind-the-scenes request from NLPC which owns a small stake in the bank.
