= James A. Bell =

American businessman

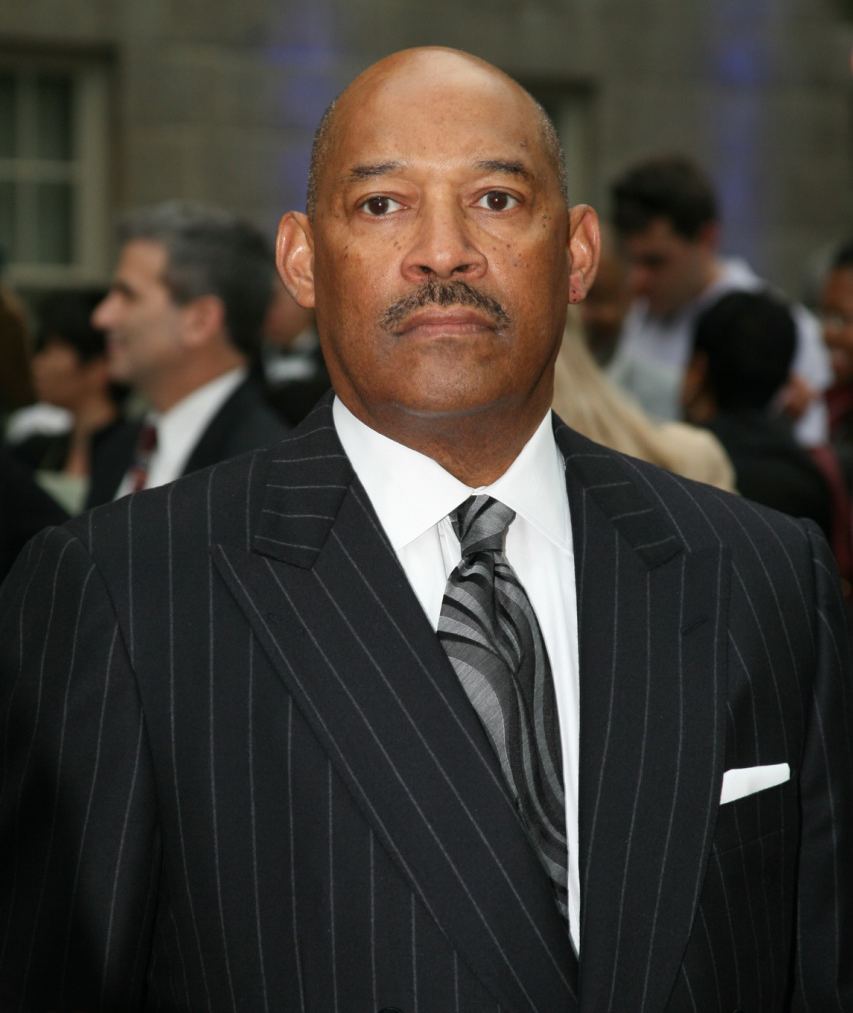
- Bell in 2009
- Born: James Aaron Bell; June 4, 1948 (age 77); Los Angeles, California, U.S.
- Education: California State University, Los Angeles (BS)
- Occupation: Former executive of The Boeing Company
- Spouse: Mary Bell
- Children: 2

James Aaron Bell (born June 4, 1948) is a retired American executive of The Boeing Company.

Bell is a retired president, executive vice president and chief financial officer of The Boeing Company. He served as interim president and chief executive officer of the Boeing Company in March 2005, following the resignation of Harry Stonecipher. He returned to his singular role as Boeing's CFO on June 30, 2005, following the appointment of Jim McNerney as the new president, chairman, and chief executive officer of the Boeing Company. He was appointed corporate president in June 2008.

Bell served on the board of directors of Apple Inc. from 2015 until 2024.

== Early life ==
On June 4, 1948, Bell was born in Los Angeles, California. Bell was the youngest of four children. Bell's mother Mamie was a former Los Angeles County government clerk. His father died in 2003.

== Education ==
In 1971, Bell earned his bachelor's degree in accounting from California State University, Los Angeles. A partial scholarship helped pay for his first year of college, but he had to earn enough to pay his way through the remainder of school.

== Career ==
In 1972 he joined the Rockwell company as an accountant. At that company he followed a path into management, from corporate senior internal auditor to accounting manager and finally as manager of general and cost accounting. He joined Boeing in 1996 when Rockwell's aerospace and defense units were acquired.

Within Boeing, he has held positions as vice president of contracts and pricing for the company's Space and Communications Division. He later became senior vice president of finance and corporate controller. In November 2004 he became the company's chief financial officer, following the firing of Michael M. Sears due to a government contract scandal. He is a member of the board of directors of J. P. Morgan Chase, Dow Chemical Company, the Chicago Urban League, World Business Chicago, the Chicago Economic Club, New Leaders for New Schools and Apple Inc.

Bell retired from the Boeing Company effective April 1, 2012. On February 1, 2012, Greg Smith succeeded Bell as executive vice president and chief financial officer of Boeing Company.

=== Career path ===
Job Tenure	Company	Position
From 1972	Rockwell International	Accountant
	Rockwell International	Corporate senior internal auditor
	Rockwell International	Accounting manager
Until 1996	Rockwell International	Manager of general and cost accounting
1996 – 2000	The Boeing Company	VP of contracts and pricing; space and communications
2000 – 2004	The Boeing Company	Senior VP of finance and corporate controller
2004 – 2005	The Boeing Company	Chief financial officer
2005 – 2005	The Boeing Company	Chief financial officer; president and CEO
2005 – 2008	The Boeing Company	Chief financial officer
2008 – 2011	The Boeing Company	CFO and corporate president

=== Awards ===
In 2004, at the 32nd Alumni Awards Gala, Bell was the recipient of California State University, Los Angeles's Distinguished Alumnus or Alumna of the College of Business and Economics.

== Personal ==
Bell and his wife, Mary, have two children, Champagne and Sean. His campaign contributions were to Democratic party politicians.

Business positions
Preceded by Harry Stonecipher	CEO of Boeing; 2005	Succeeded by James McNerney
