= Harry Stonecipher =

American businessman (born 1936)

President and Chief Executive Officer, Boeing
- In office 2003–2005
- Preceded by: Philip M. Condit
- Succeeded by: James McNerney

President and Chief Executive Officer, McDonnell Douglas
- In office 1994–1997
- Preceded by: John McDonnell

Personal details
- Born: Harry Curtis Stonecipher; May 16, 1936 (age 90) Robbins, Tennessee, U.S.
- Spouse: Joan (m. 1955; div. 2005)
- Children: 2
- Education: Tennessee Polytechnic Institute (BS)

Harrison Curtis "Harry" Stonecipher (born May 16, 1936) is an American business executive who was president and chief executive officer of American aerospace companies: Sundstrand, McDonnell Douglas, and the Boeing Company. Stonecipher was widely credited with the seeming resurgence of Boeing after government procurement scandals. However, his tenure also included major decisions to change Boeing's design and sourcing process for the new 787 airliner. These decisions later proved to be organizationally and financially disastrous for the company. Stonecipher was forced to resign from Boeing following the disclosure of an affair with a subordinate, in violation of the Boeing Code of Conduct.

== Early life and education ==
Stonecipher was born in Robbins, Tennessee.

In 1958, he graduated with a BS in physics at the Tennessee Polytechnic Institute. In May 2002, Stonecipher received an Honorary Doctorate Degree of Science from Washington University in St. Louis.

== Career ==
Stonecipher began his career at General Motors' Allison Division, where he worked as a lab technician and was influenced by Jack Welch.

He moved to General Electric's Large Engine Division in 1960, and began to move up the ranks. He became a vice president at GE in 1979, then a division head in 1984.

In 1984, he left for Sundstrand, where he became President and CEO in 1989.

=== McDonnell Douglas ===
In September 1994, Stonecipher was elected President and CEO of McDonnell Douglas, holding this post until its merger with Boeing in 1997. During this period he became much more of a public figure, and even began hosting the company's quarterly video report. He remained on the Board following the successful completion of that transaction, serving as President and COO of the merged entity. In 2001, he was elected Vice Chairman and retired as President and COO the next year, while continuing to serve on the Board as Vice Chairman.

=== Boeing ===
Stonecipher came out of retirement to lead Boeing, following the resignation of Chairman and CEO Phil Condit in December 2003 over several scandals. These scandals surrounded allegations of documents stolen from competitors and the hiring of a government procurement officer who at the time was involved in the United States Air Force's KC-767 contract. Stonecipher assumed the titles of President and CEO, which was not considered an interim appointment as there was no search initiated for a new Chief Executive, while Lewis Platt became non-executive Chairman of the Board.

Under Stonecipher's guidance, the Air Force lifted a 20-month suspension of Boeing's Launching Systems Group, which had been involved in one of the scandals, allowing them to bid on Pentagon contracts again. He also oversaw the launch of the Boeing 787 Dreamliner in order to challenge Airbus. Although not fully evident at the time, the results of major changes to Boeing's airplane program design, sourcing and financing made during Stonecipher's tenure as President and COO, and CEO later, would later prove disastrous. Shares of the company traded as high as $58.74 in 2005, up 54 percent during his tenure. However, the outsourcing and divestment decisions made 20 years earlier continue to cause Boeing serious problems in 2023.

Stonecipher famously stated that "When people say I changed the culture of Boeing, that was the intent, so that it is run like a business rather than a great engineering firm", a statement that has since been quoted many times in articles about Boeing's subsequent engineering problems in the 2020s.

After the merger, McDonnell executives took charge of the combined entity, and it was McDonnell’s financial management, under Stonecipher, that prevailed. "McDonnell Douglas bought Boeing with Boeing’s money" was a joke heard in Seattle. Stonecipher was said to refer to the company’s engineers as "arrogant". Stonecipher submitted his resignation upon request of the Boeing Board of Directors on March 6, 2005, after an internal investigation revealed a consensual relationship with Boeing executive Debra Peabody. The probe found that Boeing business operations were unaffected, that Peabody's career and compensation were not influenced, and that there was no improper use of company expenses or property. Nonetheless, the board of directors decided that there would be "zero tolerance on breaches of ethics". His wife of 50 years, Joan Stonecipher, filed for divorce just days after news of his affair became public. Stonecipher was succeeded as president and CEO on an interim basis by Chief Financial Officer James A. Bell, until Board Member James McNerney was hired on a full-time basis.

== Personal life ==
In 1955, at age 18, Stonecipher married Joan in Rossville, Georgia. Stonecipher and his now former wife have two children.

In 1995, Stonecipher and his wife Joan celebrated their 40th wedding anniversary in Chicago with friends.

In 2005, after the news broke regarding Stonecipher's affair with a Boeing executive, his wife Joan filed for divorce.

Stonecipher subsequently married Debra Peabody. Debra Stonecipher bought the historic Moubray House in Edinburgh.

Business positions
Preceded by Phil Condit	CEO of Boeing; 2003-2005	Succeeded by James A. Bell
