= Philip M. Condit =

American engineer and businessman

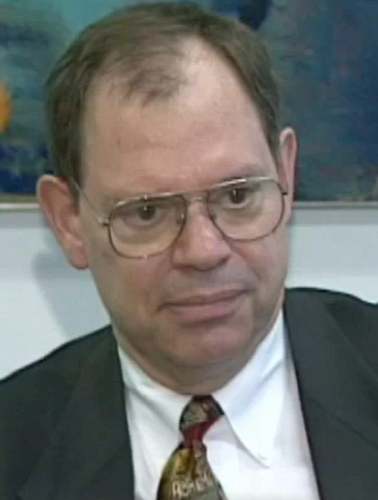
- Condit in 1997

President and Chief Executive Officer, Boeing
- In office 1996–2003
- Preceded by: Frank Shrontz
- Succeeded by: Harry Stonecipher

Personal details
- Born: Philip Murray Condit; August 2, 1941 (age 85) Berkeley, California, U.S.
- Education: University of California, Berkeley (BS); Princeton University (MS); Massachusetts Institute of Technology (MS); Tokyo University of Science (PhD)

Philip Murray Condit (born August 2, 1941) is an American engineer and businessman who was Chair and Chief executive officer (CEO) of the Boeing company from 1996 to 2003. He dramatically reshaped the company by its merger with McDonnell Douglas and relocating Boeing's headquarters from Seattle to Chicago. He resigned to take symbolic responsibility for a military procurement scandal, although he was not accused of any ethical breaches.

== Education ==
Condit was born in Berkeley, California, and became an aviation enthusiast at an early age, earning his pilot's certificate at age 18. He earned a bachelor's degree in mechanical engineering from the University of California, Berkeley in 1963, a master's degree in aeronautical engineering from Princeton University in 1965, a master's in management from the Sloan Fellows program of the MIT Sloan School of Management in 1975, and a PhD in engineering from the Tokyo University of Science. He was the first Westerner to earn such a degree from that institution.

== Boeing career ==
Phil Condit joined the Boeing company in 1965 as an aerodynamics engineer, and worked on the since-canceled Supersonic Transport program (SST). The same year he was awarded a patent for a flexible wing design called a "sailwing." In 1968, he became a lead engineer on the Boeing 747 high-speed configuration. He advanced into management within a year, then became manager of the Boeing 727 marketing in 1973.

In 1974, he entered the Sloan Fellows program at the MIT Sloan School of Management, where he completed his master's degree in management a year later. He returned to Boeing as manager of new-program planning. He then advanced to director of program management for the 707/727/737 division in 1976, and 757 chief program engineer in 1978, then director of 757 engineering in 1981.

Condit later became vice president and general manager of the 757 division in 1983; vice president of the Renton division the same year, and vice president of sales and marketing for Boeing Commercial Aircraft Company (BCAC) in 1984. In 1986, he was named as executive vice president and general manager of BCAC, then executive VP and general manager of the 777 program division.

=== Chairman and retirement ===
In 1992, he was elected president of Boeing and a member of the board of directors. Four years later he became CEO as well. In 1997, he was elected chairman, becoming the seventh chairman since the company was founded. He remained in this position until resigning on 1 December 2003, followed by retirement in March 2004. He resigned one week after firing Chief Financial Officer Michael M. Sears and Vice President Darleen Druyun when an internal investigation determined that the two had discussed a job for Druyun while she was still an Air Force procurement officer helping pass judgment on proposed Boeing contracts. Condit resigned to take symbolic responsibility, and Sears and Druyun served prison terms.

A member of the Boeing board, Lewis E. Platt, said that Boeing initially declined Condit's offer to step down, but relented after agreeing with Condit that his departure would help give the company a fresh start with its biggest customer, the U.S. government. Many Boeing workers were unhappy Condit left, according to the Seattle Times.

In a 2019 article, Jerry Useem criticized Condit and Boeing for Boeing's 2001 move to Chicago, suggesting that by "isolating" the Boeing management from its engineering and manufacturing staff, the company discounted its former engineering-led corporate culture in favor of a management style run by MBAs instead of engineers.

=== Mergers and acquisitions ===
Condit utterly transformed Boeing during his seven-year tenure as CEO, making numerous space and defense acquisitions and growing annual revenue from $23 billion to $54 billion. During his tenure Airbus reached rough parity with Boeing's commercial airplane division, and in some years exceeded Boeing in jetliner orders or deliveries. Boeing acquired Rockwell Aerospace and Hughes Space & Communications, then performed a merger with the McDonnell Douglas company in 1997. These acquisitions consolidated much of the nation's aerospace capacity into Boeing. After the September 11 attacks there was a nearly 20% decline in North American air travel, which created severe financial problems for both Boeing and the U.S. airline industry. At the time of his retirement, Condit told a reporter that the defense acquisitions had been intended to reduce the company's reliance on commercial airplanes: "We knew that commercial airplanes was going to be a capital goods, cyclic industry. We needed breadth."

== Personal life ==
Condit has been married four times. Condit's first wife was Madeleine K. Bryant. Condit's third marriage was to Jan Condit, who is also his first cousin. For his fourth marriage, he wed Geda Maso.

Condit is a member of the National Executive Board of the Boy Scouts of America, the organization's governing body.

== Awards ==
- Kokusai Shimin Sho (International Citizens Award), Japan America Society, 1997.
- Chief Executive Officer of the Year, Financial World, 1997.
- Ronald H. Brown Standards Leadership Award, 1997.
- Peter F. Drucker Strategic Leadership Award, 1998.
- Distinguished Engineering Alumnus Award, University of California, Berkeley, 1998.
- Distinguished Eagle Award, Air Command and Staff College, 1999.
- International von Karman Wings Award, The Aerospace Historical Society, 1999.

Business positions
Preceded by Frank Shrontz	CEO of Boeing; 1996-2003	Succeeded by Harry Stonecipher
