= James McNerney =

American businessman (born 1949)

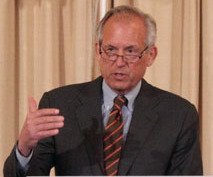
- McNerney speaking at the Department of State Global Business Conference in 2012
- Born: August 22, 1949 (age 77); Providence, Rhode Island, U.S.
- Education: Yale University (BA); Harvard University (MBA)
- Title: CEO, Chairman and President of The Boeing Company
- Term: 2005–2015
- Predecessor: Harry Stonecipher
- Successor: Dennis Muilenburg

Walter James "Jim" McNerney Jr. (born August 22, 1949) is an American business executive who was president and CEO of the Boeing Company from June 2005 to July 2015. McNerney was also chairman from June 2005 until March 1, 2016. McNerney oversaw development and extreme cost cutting of the Boeing 737 MAX which led to the deaths of 157 passengers and crew on the Ethiopia Airlines flight 302.

== Early life and education ==
McNerney was born in Providence, Rhode Island. He graduated from New Trier High School in Winnetka, Illinois, in 1967. He attended Yale University, receiving a B.A. degree in 1971. While at Yale, he was a member of the Delta Kappa Epsilon fraternity and excelled in baseball and hockey. After graduating from Yale, he worked for a year at both British United Provident and G.D. Searle, LLC. He then attended Harvard Business School, receiving a Master of Business Administration in 1975.

== Career ==
McNerney began his business career at Procter & Gamble in 1975, working in brand management. He worked as a management consultant at McKinsey from 1978 to 1982.

McNerney joined General Electric in 1982. There, he held top executive positions including president and CEO of GE Aircraft Engines and GE Lighting; president of GE Asia-Pacific; president and CEO of GE Electrical Distribution and Control; executive vice president of GE Capital; and president of GE Information Services. McNerney competed with Robert Nardelli and Jeff Immelt to succeed the retiring Jack Welch as chairman and CEO of General Electric. When Immelt won the three-way race, McNerney and Nardelli left GE (as was Welch's plan); McNerney was hired by 3M in 2001. From 2001 to 2005, McNerney held the position as chairman of the board and CEO of 3M. Former 3M employees stated that a business practice introduced by McNerney was "a creativity killer" and, in discussing the lack of innovation at 3M, that McNerney's influence had lingering effects on the company.

McNerney is currently the president, chairman, and CEO of United States Equestrian Team Foundation and was presented with the R. Bruce Duchossois Distinguished Trustee Award in 2024.

=== Boeing ===
On June 30, 2005, Boeing hired McNerney as the chairman, president, and CEO. McNerney oversaw the strategic direction of the Chicago-based aerospace company with a focus on spending controls.

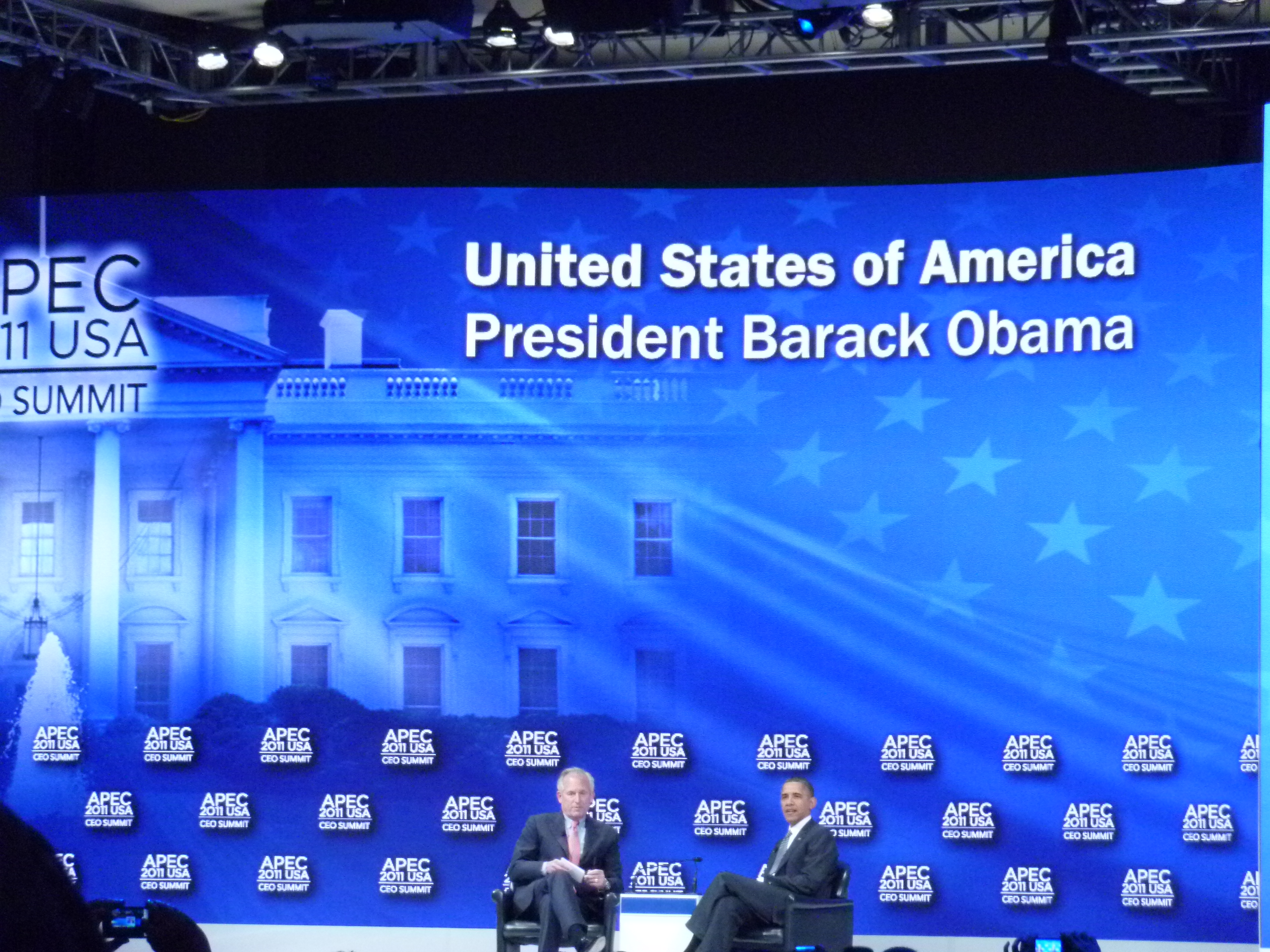
Barack Obama in conversation with James McNerney, Jr. at the 2011 APEC CEO Summit

As Boeing's first CEO without a background in aviation, he made the decision to upgrade the 737 series to 737 MAX instead of developing a new model. According to the Seattle Times, McNerney made the decision to "establish a plant in North Charleston, S.C., attempting to bust Puget Sound unions — who were responsible for saving the much-delayed airliner. Later all Dreamliners assembly shifted there, where there have been ongoing production flaws." The National Labor Relations Board filed a complaint alleging "Boeing's decision to transfer a second production line for its new 787 Dreamliner passenger plane to South Carolina was motivated by an unlawful desire to retaliate against union workers for their past strikes in Washington and to discourage future strikes." The complaint was later withdrawn as part of a settlement.

In the New York Times, writer Bill Saporito said, "Mr. McNerney’s decision meant rushing development of the 737 Max while managing the Federal Aviation Administration so that the certification of the redesigned jet — whose engines had been physically moved forward — would not require retraining of pilots, thus saving customers time and money." This "contributed to the two fatal crashes in 2018 and 2019 that prompted the 737 Max’s grounding for nearly two years." Other articles allege that "Boeing engineers contended their power and decision-making ability often was overridden by cost-conscious executives, including McNerney, in recent decades." Gautam Mukunda, professor at Yale School of Management, called McNerney "arguably the worst CEO in American history".

=== Compensation ===
In 2007, as CEO of Boeing, W. James McNerney Jr. made $12,904,478 in total compensation, which included a base salary of $1,800,077, a cash bonus of $4,266,500, options granted of $5,871,650, and Other $966,251.

In 2008, his total compensation increased to $14,765,410, which included a base salary of $1,915,288, a cash bonus of $6,089,625, and options granted of $5,914,440.

In 2009, his total compensation decreased to $13,705,435, which included a base salary of $1,930,000, a cash bonus of $4,500,300, stock options granted of $3,136,251, stock granted of $3,136,242, and other compensation totaling $1,002,642.

In 2013, McNerney made $23.2 million in total compensation, which included a $1.9 million salary, $3.7 million stock award, $3.7 million stock option grant, and an annual incentive bonus of $12.8 million.

In 2014, as chairman and CEO of Boeing, McNerney made $29 million in total compensation. Of the total: $2,004,231 was received as a salary; $14,400,000 was received as an annual bonus and a three-year performance bonus; $6,272,517 was awarded as stock (none was received in stock options); and other compensation totaling $760,000.

=== Positions ===
McNerney has been a member of the Boeing board of directors since 2001. He is also a member of the board of directors of Procter & Gamble and IBM.

McNerney served as chairman of The Business Council in 2007 and 2008. He is a current member of the Northwestern University Board of Trustees, is a trustee at the Center for Strategic and International Studies and was appointed as chairman of the President's Export Council by President Barack Obama.

In December 2016, McNerney joined a business forum assembled by then president-elect Donald Trump to provide strategic and policy advice on economic issues.

=== Career path ===
Job Tenure	Company	Position
1975–1978	Procter & Gamble	Brand Manager
1978–1982	McKinsey & Company	Senior Project Manager
1982–1988	GE Mobile Communications	General Manager
1988–1989	GE Information Services	President
1989–1991	GE Financial Services and GE Capital	Executive Vice President
1991–1992	GE Electrical Distribution and Control	President and CEO
1993–1995	GE Asia-Pacific	President
1995–1997	GE Lighting	President
1997–2000	GE Aircraft Engines	President and CEO
2000–2005	3M	President and CEO
2005–2015	The Boeing Company	Chairman, President, and CEO
