= Michael M. Sears =

American aerospace executive (born 1947)

- Born: July 16, 1947 (age 78)
- Education: BSEE, MSEE 1969; MS, University of Missouri, Rolla, 1975
- Alma mater: Purdue University
- Occupation: Aerospace executive
- Employer(s): McDonnell Aircraft Corp., Boeing
- Known for: Managed F/A-18 E/F Super Hornet development Boeing tanker procurement scandal
- Title: Major Mo. Army Nat. Guard, 1970-78
- Criminal charge: Procurement fraud
- Criminal penalty: Four months in prison; US$250,000 fine; 200 hours of community service
- Criminal status: Convicted felon
- Spouse: Debra Sue Tompkins (m. 1969)
- Children: 2

Michael M. Sears (born July 16, 1947) is an American former Boeing executive who was fired and criminally convicted for his role in the United States Air Force tanker contract controversy.

In 1992 Sears led the successful development of the F/A-18E/F Super Hornet. In 1997, Sears was President of the Douglas Aircraft Company division of McDonnell Douglas. In 2003, Sears was Boeing's CFO.

Boeing terminated Sears on November 24, 2003, as the result of corruption allegations relating to the improper hiring of Darleen Druyun. For his part in the Darleen Druyun scandal, Sears was sentenced to four months in prison, a $250,000 fine, and 200 hours of community service.
