= 2020 in aviation =

This is a list of aviation-related events in 2020. The aviation industry was impacted by the onset of the COVID-19 pandemic.

== Events ==
=== January ===
2 January
A Sikorsky UH-60 Black Hawk helicopter operated by the Republic of China Air Force (ROCAF) crashes in the Wulai District in New Taipei City, Taiwan. Eight people are killed, including Taiwan's Chief of the General Staff, Gen. Shen Yi-ming.

8 January
A Boeing 737-800 operating as Ukraine International Airlines Flight 752 from Tehran, Iran to Kyiv, Ukraine, crashes shortly after takeoff from Tehran Imam Khomeini International Airport, killing all 167 passengers and 9 crew. Iran subsequently admits that the aircraft was mistakenly shot down by a surface-to-air missile. The shootdown would become the deadliest aviation disaster of 2020.

23 January
N134CG, a Lockheed C-130 Hercules operated by New South Wales Rural Fire Service crashed while fighting bushfires near Cooma, New South Wales in Australia. Three United States personnel were killed in the accident.
China starts shutting down regular air traffic to and from Wuhan Airport in Hubei province due to the COVID-19 pandemic.

25 January
The Boeing 777X takes off from Paine Field, Washington on its first ever flight lasting roughly three hours.

26 January
Caspian Airlines Flight 6936, a McDonnell Douglas MD-83, overruns the runway on landing at Mahshahr Airport, Iran, landing on a road beyond the runway. All 144 passengers and crew survive.

27 January
An E-11A, a United States Air Force plane, crashed in the Dih Yak District, Ghazni Province, Afghanistan. At least two people were killed.

28 January
At the Heli-Expo convention in Anaheim, California, Italian helicopter manufacturer Leonardo announces it will acquire Swiss helicopter company Kopter (320 people), developer of the single-engined Kopter SH09, for at least $185 million in 2020.

29 January
Boeing releases its fourth quarter 2019 earnings report, including data for the full 12 months of 2019. The company made an annual loss for the first time since 1997.

=== February ===
5 February
A Boeing 737-800 operating Pegasus Airlines Flight 2193 from Izmir skids off the runway on landing at Istanbul Sabiha Gökçen International Airport, and breaks into pieces. Three people were killed and 179 injured.

12 February
Bombardier exits the commercial aviation business, selling its share in the A220 programme to Airbus for $591 million.

17 February
The solar-powered BAE Systems PHASA-35 HAPS built by BAE Systems makes its maiden flight from the Woomera Test Range in South Australia.

=== March ===
5 March
UK regional carrier Flybe ceases operations of its 60 Q400 and E-Jets, and files for administration after the UK government rejected a £100 million ($129 million) loan, amid the COVID-19 outbreak.

11 March
Due to the COVID-19 outbreak, US President Donald Trump announces a travel ban from Europe's Schengen area to the United States from 13 March, for 30 days. Numerous other countries implement similar bans in the following days.

13 March
American Airlines accelerates the retirement of their 757s and 767s, and later the A330s and E190s, most of the fleet was inherited from US Airways.

17 March
Trans States Airlines announces it will shut down operations on 1 April amid the coronavirus crisis, nine months earlier than previously planned due to a pilot shortage and consolidation.

18 March
The average daily number of flights in Eurocontrol airspace falls below half that of the previous year, due to travel restrictions related to the COVID-19 pandemic.

19 March
Compass Airlines, owned by Trans States Holdings and flying regional routes for American Airlines as American Eagle from Los Angeles, writes to its employees it will shut down completely on 7 April.

=== April ===
14 April
The Government of South Africa refuses a request by South African Airways for R10 billion (600 Million USD) in emergency funding needed to continue operation of the airline, which was already insolvent and undergoing business rescue when all flights were suspended due to the coronavirus.

15 April
As demand continues to collapse due to the impact of the COVID-19 pandemic on aviation, over two-thirds of the worldwide fleet of 22,000 mainline passenger airliners are inactive, leaving 7,635 in operation. Europe is most affected, with less than 15% of aircraft operating, compared to 45% in North America and 49% in Asia. A greater proportion of narrowbody aircraft are inactive (37%) than widebody aircraft (27%).

17 April
The Government of Kazakhstan revokes the air operator's certificate of Bek Air and all airworthiness certificates for its Fokker 100 aircraft, citing the airline's failure to correct safety violations discovered after the fatal 2019 crash of Bek Air Flight 2100.

23 April
The US Federal Aviation Administration reduces the operating hours of about 100 air traffic control facilities due to the drastic drop in air traffic caused by the coronavirus pandemic.

25 April
Boeing announces it has terminated the planned Boeing–Embraer joint venture with Embraer, after the April 24 delay expired.

27 April
In the first total closure of a US commercial airport for pandemic-related reasons, local leaders close Westchester County Airport to airlines in order to expedite a major runway repaving project, citing the indefinite suspension of almost all airline flights there.

=== May ===
4 May
An Embraer EMB 120 Brasilia, operated by East African Express Airways on an air charter flight delivering pandemic relief supplies, crashes on approach to Berdale, Somalia, killing all 2 crew and 4 non-revenue passengers on board. On 10 May, a leaked African Union peacekeeping force report alleges that the aircraft was mistakenly shot down by ground troops of the Ethiopian National Defense Force who were operating outside the peacekeeping force's authority.

5 May
The term "preighter" is coined by Lufthansa CEO Carsten Spohr to describe the increasingly common practice of using passenger aircraft to operate cargo-only flights.

17 May
The prototype Cessna 408 SkyCourier makes its first flight from Beech Factory Airport, to be used for testing leading to certification along five additional test airframes.

18 May
The Pipistrel E-811 is the first electric aircraft engine to be awarded a type certificate by EASA for use in general aviation. The E-811 powers the Pipistrel Velis Electro.

22 May
Pakistan International Airlines Flight 8303, an Airbus A320 flying from Lahore to Karachi with 91 passengers and 8 crew, reports failures of both engines while in final approach and crashes into a residential area. Ninety-seven people on board are killed in the accident, while two passengers survived with injuries.

=== June ===
4 June
Zipair Tokyo, a subsidiary of Japan Airlines, begins operations with the Boeing 787-8 Dreamliner.

10 June
The Velis Electro variant of the two-seat Pipistrel Virus is the first electric aircraft to secure certification, from the EASA.

11 June
The AIDC T-5 Brave Eagle, a jet trainer, makes its maiden flight in Taiwan.

30 June
Aeroméxico files for bankruptcy in the United States due to pandemic-related losses, but expects to continue flying during restructuring.

=== July ===
1 July
After 1500 hours of flight tests and demo flights with three prototypes, the Airbus Helicopters H160 is type certified by the EASA on 1 July 2020, before FAA certification and delivery to a US customer planned for the same year.

2 July
The Stratos 716X single-engine kit business jet made a 22 minute maiden flight in Redmond, Oregon, climbing to 13,500 ft and launching a several month flight-test program.

=== August ===
7 August
Air India Express Flight 1344, a Boeing 737 flying from Dubai International Airport to Calicut International Airport, suffers a runway excursion upon landing. Both pilots and 19 passengers are killed in the accident.

11 August
Azul launches a regional subsidiary with both a passenger and a cargo branch, dubbed Azul Conecta. It flies Cessna 208s.

22 August
An Antonov An-26 operating a South West Aviation cargo flight from Juba to Aweil, South Sudan, crashes upon take-off, killing 8 of the 9 occupants on board.

27 August
The Otto Celera 500L, an experimental high-efficiency business and utility aircraft, is unveiled.

=== September ===
24 September
Retrofitted Piper M350 Malibu completes first commercial passenger hydrogen fuel cell-powered zero emissions flight from Cranfield, Bedfordshire.
United Airlines declares that it will be the first US airline to roll out a COVID-19 testing program for passengers, giving flyers from San Francisco bound for Hawaii the option to order an at-home testing kit, or to reserve a time for a rapid test at the airport.

30 September
US firm General Atomics bought from RUAG the Dornier 228 production line in Oberpfaffenhofen, including the transfer of all 450 employees, pending regulatory approval.
Unable to raise adequate funds to implement its business rescue plan, bankrupt South African Airways indefinitely suspends all flight operations except previously scheduled repatriation and cargo flights.

=== October ===
1 October
Boeing announces the 787 will be produced only in North Charleston from mid-2021 due to the impact of the pandemic, as its production rate fall to six per month.
Federal government COVID-19 pandemic relief for US airlines expires with the United States Congress deadlocked over extending further aid. Various US airlines respond by commencing massive layoffs and furloughs, with American Airlines to cut 19,000 jobs, and United Airlines to cut 13,000.

5 October
AirAsia Japan permanently ceases flights due to mounting losses stemming from COVID-19 international flight restrictions.

8 October
As several airlines accelerate retirement of the Boeing 747-400 due to the COVID-19 pandemic, the last two 744s of British Airways - the type's largest operator until this point - leave London Heathrow, officially completing BA's retirement of this type.

31 October
After almost 10 years of construction-related delays and €4 billion in cost overruns, Berlin Brandenburg Airport opens to commercial passenger flights, to replace both Berlin Tegel Airport and the recently closed Berlin Schönefeld Airport as the primary international airport for the city of Berlin and the state of Brandenburg.

=== November ===
18 November
The Federal Aviation Administration clears the Boeing 737 MAX to return to flight after its grounding.

=== December ===
3 December
Ryanair orders 75 Boeing 737 MAX 8-200s, the first large order since the grounding, for a list value of $7bn but an actual value estimated at $3bn or less.

7 December
Chuck Yeager, the first man to break the sound barrier in level flight, dies at the age of 97. He achieved this record in a Bell X-1 rocket plane on 14 October 1947, winning the Collier Trophy afterwards.
Due to the COVID-19 pandemic, the Paris Air Show announces the cancellation of the June 2021 event, with the next event to be held in June 2023.

9 December
Brazilian Gol Transportes Aéreos becomes the first airline to resume scheduled flights of the Boeing 737 MAX since its grounding in 2019.

10 December
South African low cost carrier Lift flies its first flight.

11 December
Mexican airline Interjet indefinitely suspends flights after four years of sustained operating losses.

17 December
The Indian Ministry of Defence endorses the conversion of six Airbus A320s formerly of Air India into airborne early warning and control aircraft for the Indian Armed Forces, replacing a 2015 plan to use two new-built Airbus A330s.

18 December
The Indonesian Directorate General of Civil Aviation issues a type certificate for the Indonesian Aerospace N-219, derived from the CASA C-212 Aviocar.

19 December
Canadian airline OWG, an acronym for Off We Go, begins operations, flying to Cuba with the Boeing 737-400. The airline is a subsidiary of Canadian airline Nolinor.

27 December
The US Consolidated Appropriations Act, 2021 provides another $15 billion in aid for US airlines. American Airlines and United Airlines begin to recall thousands of workers laid off with the October expiration of the previous aid package, and Southwest Airlines rescinds anticipated 2021 pay cuts and furloughs.

29 December
American Airlines resumes scheduled 737 MAX flights, the first US airline to do so.

== First flights ==
- 25 January – Boeing 777X N779XW
- 14 February - Gulfstream G700 N700GA
- 17 May – Cessna 408 SkyCourier N408PR
- 11 June – AIDC T-5 Brave Eagle 11001
- 2 July – Stratos 716X N716X
- 16 December – Ilyushin Il-114-300 54114

== Deadliest crash ==
The deadliest crash of this year was Ukraine International Airlines Flight 752, a Boeing 737 which was shot down shortly after takeoff from Tehran, Iran, on 8 January, killing all 176 people on board.

== See also ==
- Impact of the COVID-19 pandemic on airlines
- Impact of the COVID-19 pandemic on aviation
