= Impact of the COVID-19 pandemic on commercial air transport =

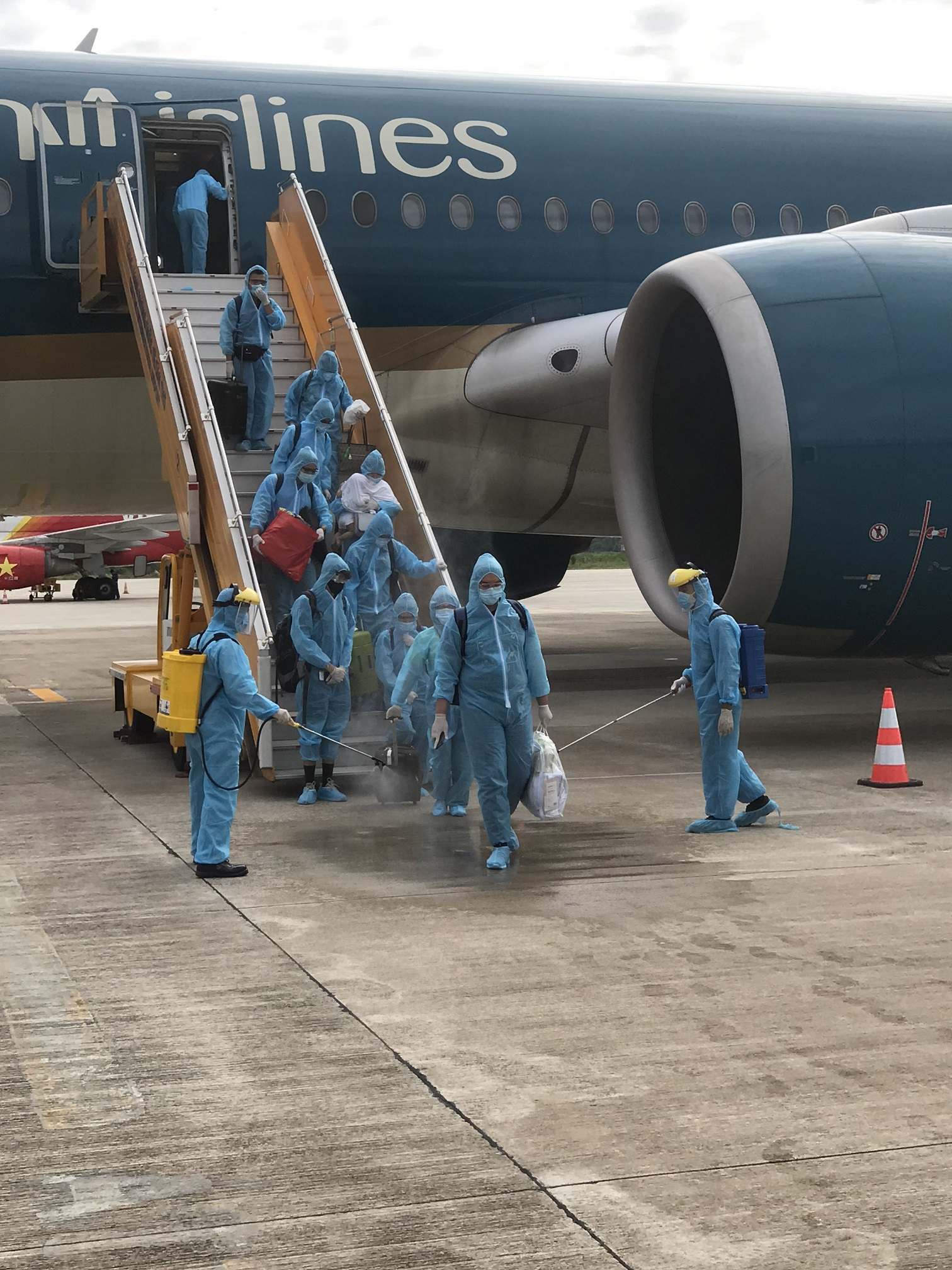
Passengers with full medical hazmat suits disembarking from a repatriation flight operated by Vietnam Airlines. Ground crew equipped with disinfectant sprayers can be seen decontaminating the passengers as they reach the bottom of the boarding stairs.

The COVID-19 pandemic has had a significant impact on the airline industry due to travel restrictions and a decimation in demand among travelers.

Significant reductions in passenger numbers have resulted in flights being cancelled or planes flying empty between airports, which in turn massively reduced revenues for airlines and forced many airlines to lay off employees or declare bankruptcy. Some have attempted to avoid refunding cancelled trips to diminish their losses. Airliner manufacturers and airport operators have also laid off employees.

Only several months into the pandemic, the crisis was already the worst in the aviation industry's history, according to statements made in early 2020 by Airbus' Guillaume Faury, EasyJet's Johan Lundgren, United Airlines' Oscar Munoz, Qantas' Alan Joyce, and media outlets: the Financial Times, The New York Times, and The Independent.

== Flight cancellations ==
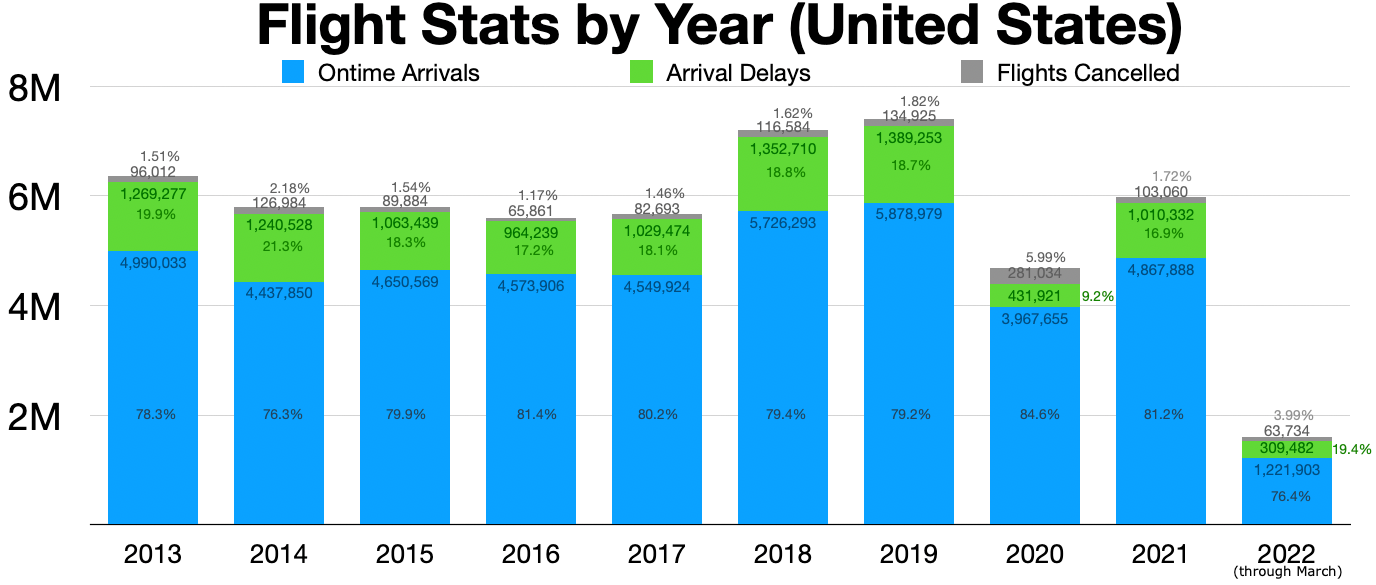
Flight stats by year Flight cancellations Flight delays On-time Arrivals

Government regulations in Europe and the United States mandated that airlines refund fares when flights are cancelled, but in many cases airlines have instead offered vouchers or travel credits that must be used by the end of the year. (Some airlines have extended the voucher window to May 2022.) Despite pleas from industry lobbyists to expand the regulations to allow travel credits, the U.S. Department of Transportation has reiterated that airlines are obligated to provide refunds for cancelled flights. Travel vouchers are currently allowed when passengers cancel travel plans due to travel warnings, stay at home orders and other restrictions. In spite of the cancellations, thousands of nearly-empty "ghost flights" continued to fly in order to maintain landing slots.

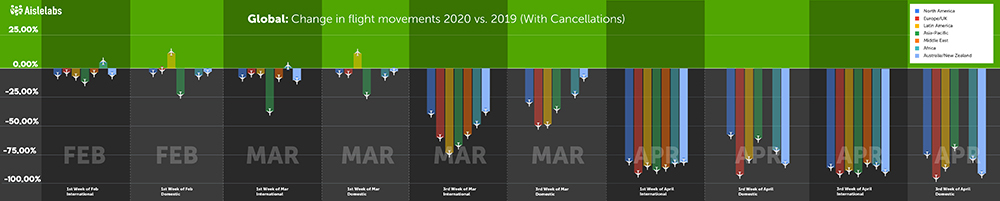
Aviation sector recorded an 80% decrease in flight movements across all geographic regions, including America, Europe, Asia-Pacific and Middle East as of 4 May 2020.

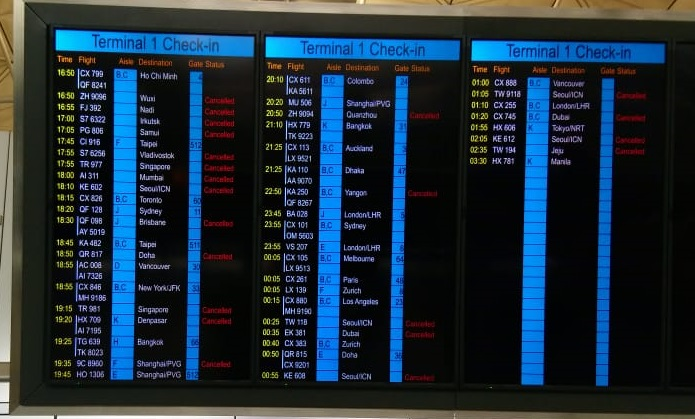
Many flights from Hong Kong were cancelled in March 2020 due to the pandemic.

Early March 2020 saw 10% of all flights cancelled compared to 2019. As the pandemic progressed, 40–60% fewer flight movements were recorded in late March with international flights affected the most. By April 2020, over 80% flight movements were restricted across all regions. Research shows that world recovery of passenger demand to pre-COVID-19 levels is estimated to take 2.4 years (recovery by late 2022), with the most optimistic estimate being 2 years (recovery by mid-2022), and the most pessimistic estimate 6 years (recovery in 2026). Large regional differences are detected: the Asia-Pacific has the shortest estimated average recovery time of 2.2 years, followed by North America in 2.5 years, and Europe 2.7 years. For air freight demand, a shorter average world recovery time of 2.2 years is predicted if compared to passenger demand. On the regional level, Europe and North America are comparable with average recovery times of 2.2 years, while the Asia-Pacific is predicted to recover faster in 2.1 years.

In 2022, recovery of travel demand exceeded airlines' ability to hire back pilots and ground staff quickly enough, causing several months of widespread delays and cancellations across the United States and Europe.

== Air cargo ==
As passenger flights were cancelled, the cost of sending cargo by air changed rapidly. The cost of sending cargo across the Pacific Ocean tripled by late March 2020.

Adjusted cargo capacity fell by 4.4% in February 2020 while air cargo demand also fell by 9.1%, but the near-halt in passenger traffic cut capacity even deeper as half of global air cargo is carried in passenger jets' bellies. Air freight rates rose as a consequence, from $0.80 per kg for transatlantic cargoes to $2.50–4 per kg, enticing passenger airlines to operate cargo-only flights through the use of preighters, while cargo airlines brought back into service fuel-guzzling stored aircraft, helped by falling oil prices. Passenger airlines were enticed to convert aircraft.

At the end of March 2020, cargo capacity was down by 35% compared to the previous year: North America to Asia Pacific capacity fall by 17% (19% in the opposite direction) Asia-Pacific to Europe was down by 30% (reverse: -32%), intra-Asia was down by 35%. Lagging the capacity reductions, demand was down by 23% in March, resulting in higher freight rates: from China/Hong Kong, between 2 March 2020 and 6 April 2020 +158% to Europe and +90.5% to North America. By May, freight rates from Shanghai were $12/kg to North America, $11/kg to Europe.

The cargo shortage may evaporate if the global economic crisis depresses demand: the WTO forecast a global trade contraction of 13–32% in 2020.

International mail between many countries stopped completely, either due to suspension of domestic service or lack of transportation.

== Business aviation ==
Business aviation was less affected than airline traffic, in that top executives' travel is often considered essential. London Biggin Hill Airport reported traffic to be around 30% of 2019 levels, with transatlantic traffic strong. Once lockdown restrictions are eased, business aviation has an opportunity to capture premium passengers who might previously have chosen airlines, but who may prefer the social distancing afforded by a private jet.

United States air charter travel strongly increased in February and March as airlines slashed schedules, making commercial flights increasingly unpredictable; however, some charter operators such as JetSuite subsequently saw a drastic drop in business as widespread stay-at-home orders took effect in April 2020.

== By sector ==
=== Airlines ===
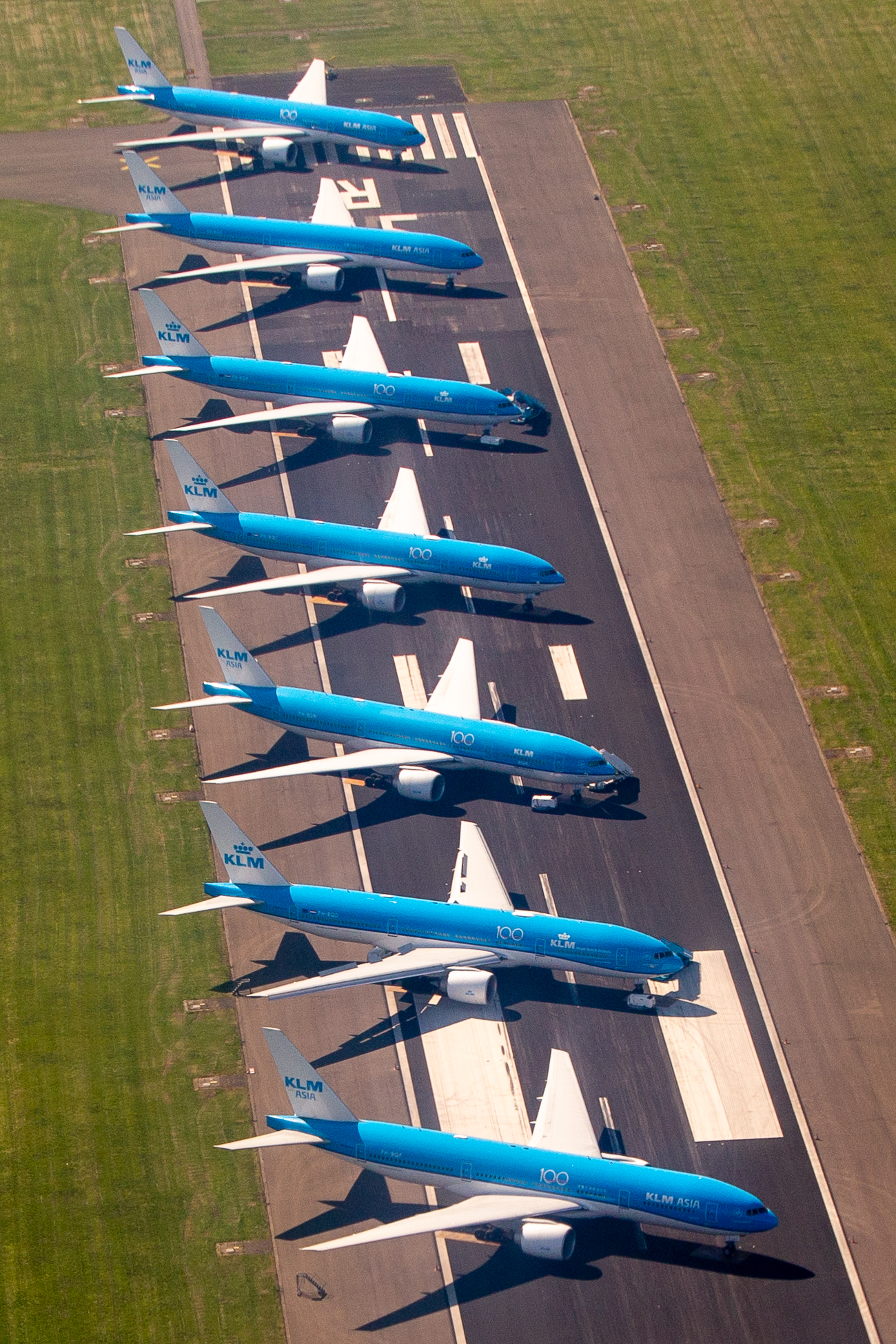
KLM Boeing 777-200ERs parked on Schiphol runway during the crisis

On 5 March 2020, the International Air Transport Association (IATA) estimated that the airline industry could lose between US$63 to 113 billion of revenues due to the reduced number of passengers. IATA had previously estimated revenue losses of around US$30 billion two weeks before their 5 March estimate. By 17 March, IATA had stated that its 5 March estimate was "outdated", and that airlines would require $200 billion in bailouts to survive the crisis. IATA further revised their revenue loss estimate on 24 March to be $252 billion globally, a 44 percent drop. Another further estimate was published on 14 April, which forecasted a revenue drop of $314 billion (55 percent) and a traffic drop of 48 percent in passenger count for 2020.

Due to the sudden and large losses of revenue, airlines began to hold out against refunding cancelled flights and tickets to conserve cash, despite government regulations. In Europe, airlines had successfully negotiated to defer some $1.2 billion in air traffic control charges.

Oliver Wyman reported that Asian airlines reduced their available seat miles by 23 percent in March 2020. In Europe, the impact of the outbreak is expected to accelerate corporate consolidation in the airline industry. According to consultancy CAPA Centre for Aviation, most airlines would be bankrupted by the end of May 2020.

Air travel demand rose 2.4 percent year-on-year in January 2020, the lowest it has been since the April 2010 eruptions of Eyjafjallajökull, though travel disruptions due to coronavirus only began in late January. By March, the number of flights had plummeted, with about 280,000 flights reported between 24 and 30 March 2020 compared to around 780,000 in a similar period the previous year. Despite a lack of passengers, regulations regarding flight slots initially compelled British airlines to fly empty planes to European airports to avoid losing their slots. Fuel prices dropping (due to an oil price war between Russia and Saudi Arabia) by around a quarter could not compensate for the fall in demand.

Analysts expect airlines to reduce the size of their fleets as a result of the downturn, and point out that this could be done either by modernizing fleets—hastening the retirement of older aircraft and maintaining planned deliveries of new, more fuel-efficient models—or by retaining older planes and reducing capital expenditure on new aircraft.

By mid-April 2020, the inactive fleet ballooned to almost 14,400, over two thirds of the 22,000 mainline passenger airliners, leaving 7,635 in operation stood: predominantly in Europe, where less than 15% are operating, than in North America (45%) or Asia (49%); and affecting narrow-body aircraft (37%) less than wide-body aircraft (27%). Consequently, demand for aircraft storage increased to the point where runways and taxiways in normally busy airports such as Frankfurt Airport and Atlanta Airport were closed to make room for storage.

In April 2020, global passenger capacity is down 91%; the ICAO anticipates 1.2 billion fewer travelers by September 2020 compared to a typical year, a revenue fall of $160–253 billion for the first nine months of 2020. While European airlines owe $10 billion for cancelled flights, IATA is predicting a 55% fall in revenue compared to 2019, a $89 billion hit, costing $452 billion on the wider economy. Boeing anticipates passenger traffic recovering in two to three years to 2019 levels, but expects production to take longer.

The Airports Council International estimates 4.6 billion fewer passengers in 2020, down from 9.1 billion in 2019. The IATA expects RPKs to be down by half from 2019 except in North America, down by 36%; for $314 billion lower revenues, a 55% fall. The association forecast air travel to lag economic recovery by up to two years: air traffic in 2021 would still be down by 24% from 2019, and a return to 2019 levels would happen by 2023–2025.

By June 2020, the IATA was projecting a collective net loss of $84.3 billion yearly for Airlines, worse than the $30 billion loss during the Great Recession, and projects that income will remain negative through 2021.

By mid-April 2020, 14,500 mainline airliners were stored, leaving 7,400 active: one third of the whole fleet, even one fifth for European carriers; down from 20,200 in active service and 1,800 in storage before. By mid-June, 10,500 were still stored while 11,500 were active, with an average daily utilisation down by 35% from 2019; led by Asia-Pacific airlines with almost 75% of the fleet flying, then Europe with one third still stored, then North America with a 50/50 split. Major airliner deliveries dropped from a typical 90 to 100 aircraft a month to an average of less than 40 in the first half of 2020.

As traffic may not return to pre-pandemic levels until 2024, older, less fuel-efficient, and higher-maintenance aircraft retirement is accelerating, including the Boeing 777, Airbus A330 and Airbus A380. They are replaced with newer Airbus A350 and Boeing 787s, as a surplus of used aircraft is expected until 2030.

By the third quarter of 2020, China Southern became the first of the large Chinese carriers to return to profitability, while Air China and China Eastern managed to narrow their losses, helped by domestic travel recovery by September after traffic bottomed out in February—but international demand is still in the doldrums. By May 2021, 7,850 airliners were still in storage, down from a peak of 16,522 in April 2020. As US traffic recovers, networks are evolving towards more point-to-point transit to leisure destinations, bypassing major airline hubs while business travel is still lagging.

The aggregation of the 66 largest airlines with public financials (Note: not included: Air India, Globalia (Air Europa's parent), Hainan Airlines, LOT Polish Airlines, South African Airways, and Virgin Australia) showed a revenue falling by 60% from $658Bn in 2019 to $262Bn in 2020, while net profits went from $17bn to a $140bn loss, a $157bn decrease.

By the end of 2021, the global airline industry had returned to 79% of its pre-Covid size according to Airline Business, using an index from 13 of the largest airline groups: 86% of the workforce size, 96% of the fleet size, 71% of the revenue and 62% of the passenger numbers.

In the final quarter of 2022, the same index was at 105% of the 2019 activity: 84% of passenger numbers with higher fares due to strong demand and constrained capacity, 97% of the fleet size, 92% of the employee number.

Sun et al. 's study notes that during the pandemic the International Air Transport Association (IATA) recommends a distance of 1–2 m between passengers at all times. Therefore, in order to maintain appropriate social distancing, airlines in various countries have responded by adjusting the order and method of boarding. For example, Delta Air Lines' boarding and seating rules are for middle seats to be empty and rows to be moved from back to front and United Airlines' rules are from back to front, Business class last. Although airlines have adopted a rear-to-front boarding process, studies have shown that this method of boarding is slow and it does not necessarily reduce social proximity.

=== Aerospace manufacturers ===
As demand plummeted, values fell 2% to 22% between January and May 2020 for five-year old aircraft, and lease rates by 4% to 26%. By August, values fell further by 9% to 25% since January, and lease rates by 12% to 45%. By November, market values of 20-year-old large single-aisles had fallen by 22% to 29% while their lease rates had fallen by 44% to 50%, and market values of 20-year-old widebody twins had fallen by 15 to 35% while their lease rates had fallen by 20 to 44%.

As the pandemic reduced demand for new jets in early 2020, manufacturers trimmed airliner production rates and were producing aircraft they are unable to deliver. Airbus cut its monthly production from 60 to 40 A320s, from 4.5 to two A330s, and from nine to six A350s. Boeing reduced its output per month from 14 to six 787s, from five to two 777s, and 737 Max production was already halted, as a rate of 31 per month was targeted by early 2022. Bloomberg was expecting Airbus and Boeing to deliver 30 jets monthly each in 2021, mostly for single-aisles.

In 2020, deliveries were down by more than 50% compared to 2019, after 10 years of growth. Cirium forecasts a traffic recovery towards 2024 and a 3.3% growth per year over 20-years, needing 43,315 airliner deliveries. The projection is 8% less than before the crisis, while retirements are accelerated.

- Airbus reduced its wing production on factories in Broughton, Filton and Bremen, and reduced working hours in the sites. Its French and Spanish sites suspended production for several days before a partial resumption on 23 March. Monthly production was cut to four A220s, forty A320s, two A330s and six A350s. Airbus delivered 122 aircraft in the first quarter, 40 fewer than in the previous year, and 60 could not be handed over due to travel restrictions. Airliner revenues were down 22% to €7.5 billion, earnings dropped by 82% to €57 million, and their adjusted EBIT was down 59% to €191 million. The company free cash flow was a negative €8 billion, including the €3.6 billion bribery penalties, similar to the negative €4.3 billion of the previous year without. For the first quarter, Airbus' total adjusted EBIT was halved to €281 million, and it made a net loss of €481 million (compared to a €40 million profit in the previous year). In 2020, capital expenditure should be reduced by €700 million to €1.9 billion.
- Boeing froze hiring and reportedly laid off employees due to a large number of cancellations, which outpaced new orders in February 2020. On 11 March, it was revealed that Boeing was to exercise its whole US$13.8 billion loan facility (which it secured in February). Prior to the pandemic, Boeing's business had been impacted by groundings of its 737 MAX aircraft. By 7 April, Boeing had indefinitely suspended production at Boeing South Carolina and Puget Sound, Washington, completely halting the assembly of its commercial aircraft. On 21 April, Boeing announced a management structure overhaul. On 27 May, it announced plans to lay off 12,000 employees, while it reported zero new orders in April 2020. In October, it announced plans to lay off thousands more employees through the following year, with the expectation that it would end 2021 with 19% fewer employees than its pre-pandemic workforce.
- Bombardier on 26 March 2020 announced a suspension of most Canadian production in Ontario (for 2 weeks) and Quebec (until 13 April), in addition to halting production in Northern Ireland. 12,400 Bombardier employees in Canada (70 percent of the workforce) were furloughed.
- CFM International deliveries of CFM LEAP engines across the first nine months of 2020 fell to 622 from 1,316 in the same period in 2019, and 123 CFM56s against 327, while Leap fleet cycles were down 15% year-on-year and CFM56 cycles were 48% lower.
- Embraer reported deferment of orders of its commercial aircraft. It also suspended its financial guidance for 2020.
- General Electric announced on 23 March 2020 that it would cut one tenth of employees in its jet engine arm, amounting to around 2,500 employees, in addition to furloughing around half of its maintenance and repair staff.
- Mitsubishi in May 2020 halved the budget of its SpaceJet programme and repatriated all work from the US to Japan. In October 2020 it announced a further budget reduction and put almost all SpaceJet activities on hold.
- Rolls-Royce planned to cut 9,000 jobs, mainly in its civil aerospace division, and mainly affecting its UK site at Derby.
- Textron Inc., the parent company of Textron Aviation and Bell Helicopter, announced a 1,950 jobs layoff.
- United Aircraft Corporation, Russian Industry and Trade Minister said "is quite balanced as a production unit". Because recovery is quicker in Russia than abroad, the production program is drafted for 2020–2021. Also, the market will require up to 1,500 new civil jets within the next 15 to 20 years, adding that there is scope for optimism in the domestic industry.

On 25 April 2020, Boeing announced it had terminated the planned Boeing–Embraer joint venture after the 24 April delay expired, attributing it to Embraer's failure to meet conditions. Later the same day, Embraer asserted that it had satisfied the conditions for consolidation to proceed, and that it would seek compensation for Boeing's allegedly wrongful termination of the deal. Aviation analyst Scott Hamilton believed the collapse in demand for airliners caused by the pandemic and the resulting cash constraints motivated Boeing's defection, along with the desire to avoid the perception that it was using government pandemic relief funds for foreign investment.

=== Airports ===
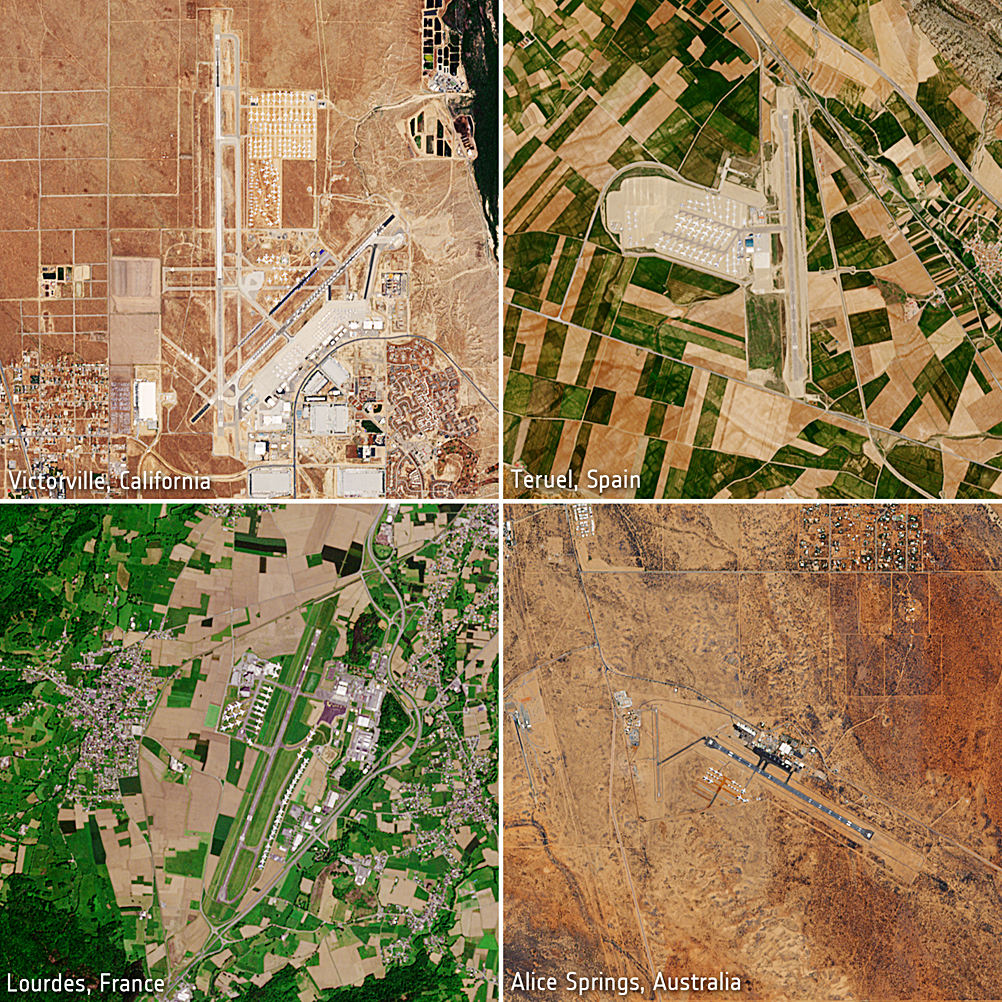
Parked planes in May 2020 at Victorville, California; Teruel, Spain; Lourdes, France; Alice Springs, Australia

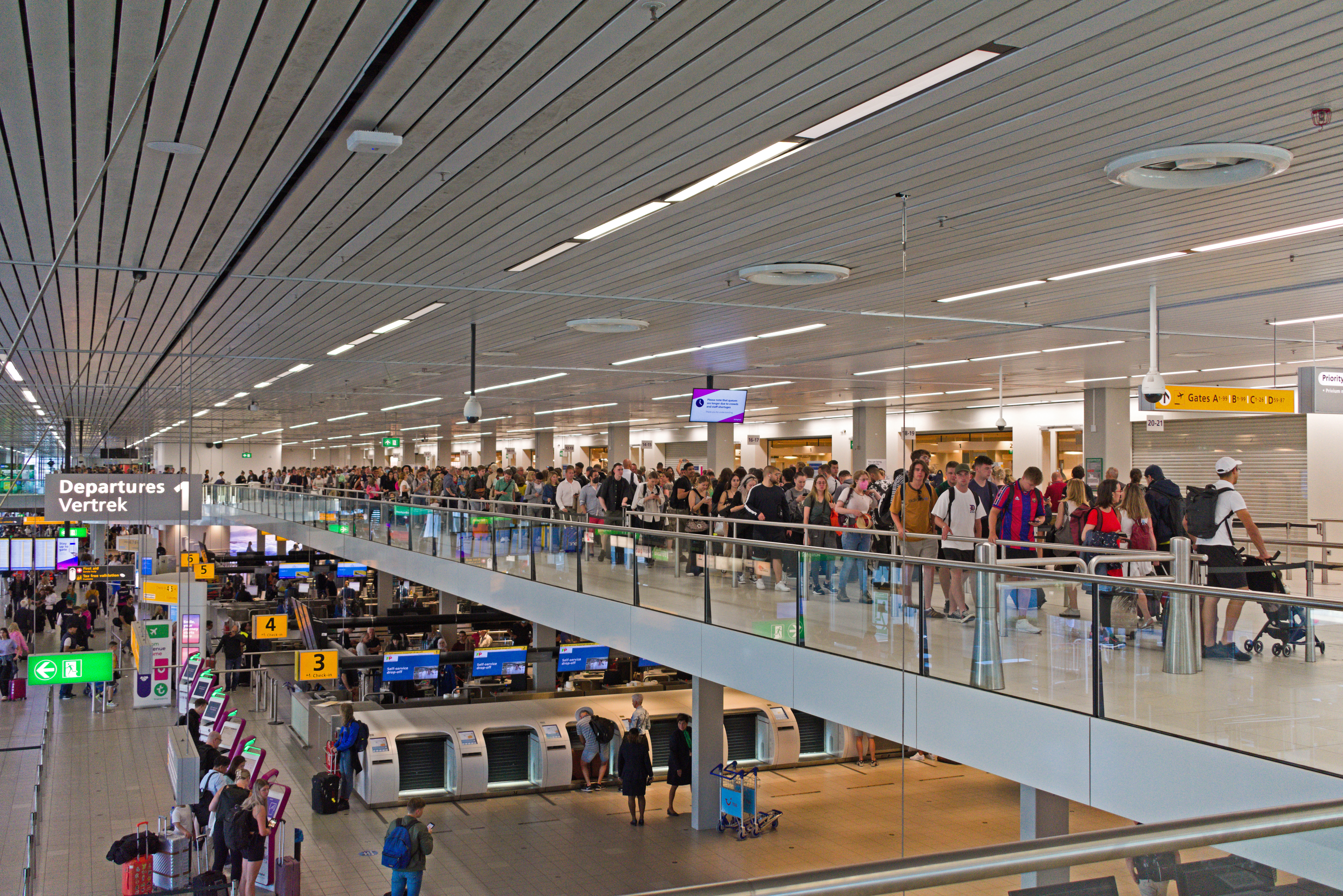
Queues to the security control at Amsterdam Airport Schiphol in June 2022

- From March 2020, various United States airlines stored hundreds of disused aircraft at Southern California Logistics Airport and Roswell International Air Center.
- Runways and taxiways at Frankfurt Airport, Hartsfield–Jackson Atlanta International Airport, and Tulsa International Airport were closed and used as aircraft storage areas by Lufthansa, Delta Air Lines, and American Airlines respectively.
- Ciudad Real International Airport and Madrid Airport benefited from medical equipment cargo corridors from China.
- By mid-April 2020, Airports Council International (ACI) observed a 95% fall in traffic in 18 airports in major aviation markets in Asia-Pacific and the Middle East.
- On 27 April 2020, Westchester County Airport closed to airlines for about a month for a major runway repaving project, which was originally scheduled to be undertaken in stages late at night over the span of four months. The decision to close and expedite the project was made because the number of daily flights had fallen drastically. This was the first total closure of a United States commercial airport for pandemic-related reasons.
- Various airlines from outside Australia stored aircraft at Alice Springs Airport.
- On 5 May 2020, ACI World estimated that in 2020, passenger traffic worldwide would amount to less than half of what was previously projected for the year.
- UK airports axed expansion plans valued at £1 billion.
- In May 2020, Dallas/Fort Worth International Airport (DFW) was the world's busiest airport measured by aircraft movements despite significantly lower traffic than normal. American Airlines diminished point-to-point routes and instead sent flights through its DFW hub, creating traffic volumes surpassing those at the normally busier O'Hare International Airport and Hartsfield–Jackson Atlanta International Airport by substantial margins.
- In May 2020, Salt Lake City International Airport reported that an in-progress redevelopment project would be sped up by as much as two years by the pandemic. Lower passenger numbers meant that larger areas of the airport could be closed much earlier than expected for demolition and renovation, saving up to $300 million for the project overall.
- Orly Airport in Paris was closed to commercial traffic from 1 April to 25 June 2020.
- In Europe, some of the airports that saw the most parked airliners during the pandemic were Ciudad Real International Airport, Madrid Airport, Teruel Airport and Istanbul Airport.
- In late October 2020, ACI Europe stated that 193 (mostly regional) of the 740 airports in Europe were risking bankruptcy.
- Coronavirus related travel restrictions imposed in 2020 reduced traffic by 70% at the Dubai International Airport. The number of travellers through this tourism hub dropped to 25.9 million in 2020.
- As compared to Q1 of 2020, Dubai International Airport's passenger traffic has plunged 67.8% to reach 5.75 million in Q1 of 2021. Along with the main airports in Tokyo, Los Angeles, London, Chicago and Paris, Dubai has also dropped out of the top 10 rankings for total passengers last year.
- On 17 July 2021, ACI World estimated that global passenger traffic in 2020 was reduced by over 5.9 billion passengers, a loss of 62.3% of what was estimated for the year. In 2021, the loss is estimated at just over 5 billion passengers, representing 50.9% of the total estimated for the year.
- In Summer 2022, many airports experienced extraordinary long delays and a large number of cancelled flights, as a consequence of the pandemic. In particular, at Amsterdam Airport Schiphol, the pandemic led to recession of air traffic and subsequently to the shortage of security staff and walkout of baggage handlers, which resulted in hours long queues.

=== Regulators ===
- In March 2020, the United States Federal Aviation Administration (FAA) announced that it would not take enforcement action against pilots whose medical certificates expired between 31 March and 30 June, due to the difficulty of scheduling appointments with certified Aviation Medical Examiners. In June, the FAA expected that the exception would be extended.
- The FAA announced on 23 April 2020 a reduction in the operating hours of over 100 control towers and terminal radar approach control facilities, citing a drop in air traffic of as much as 96%. Pilots were advised that certain air traffic control services and instrument landing system approaches may be periodically unavailable.

=== Government ===
- On 8 June 2020, the Austrian conservative–green coalition government concluded a support deal for Austrian Airlines (a subsidiary of Lufthansa) for €150 million in taxpayer grants, and €300 million in banking loans that are to be paid back. This was significantly less than expected (Austrian Airlines had applied for €767 million), and came under the stringent conditions (some of which also applied to other airline companies operating in Austria) to restrict short-distance airline operations, to ban cheap tickets below €40 and include a €12 environmental tax to each ticket, and to half its CO^{2} emissions by 2030.

=== Other organizations ===
- Many United States general aviation social events and fly-ins scheduled for the spring of 2020 were cancelled or postponed, including Sun 'n Fun and several conducted by the Aircraft Owners and Pilots Association.
- On 1 May 2020, citing uncertainty about COVID-19 social restrictions imposed by the state of Wisconsin, the Experimental Aircraft Association canceled EAA AirVenture Oshkosh for 2020.
- Air charter company JetSuite ceased flight operations on 15 April 2020 and its parent company filed for bankruptcy on 28 April 2020; CEO Alex Wilcox attributed the company's collapse to a 90% drop in business due to widespread stay-at-home orders.
- Travel technology company Sabre Corporation furloughed one third of its workforce on 23 April 2020, citing an 81% drop in revenue due to drastically reduced airline and other travel bookings. Sabre had previously cut salaries by 20%, suspended 401(k) pension contributions, cut various other expenses, and obtained a US$1.1 billion loan, but these steps reportedly failed to offset losses.

== By country ==
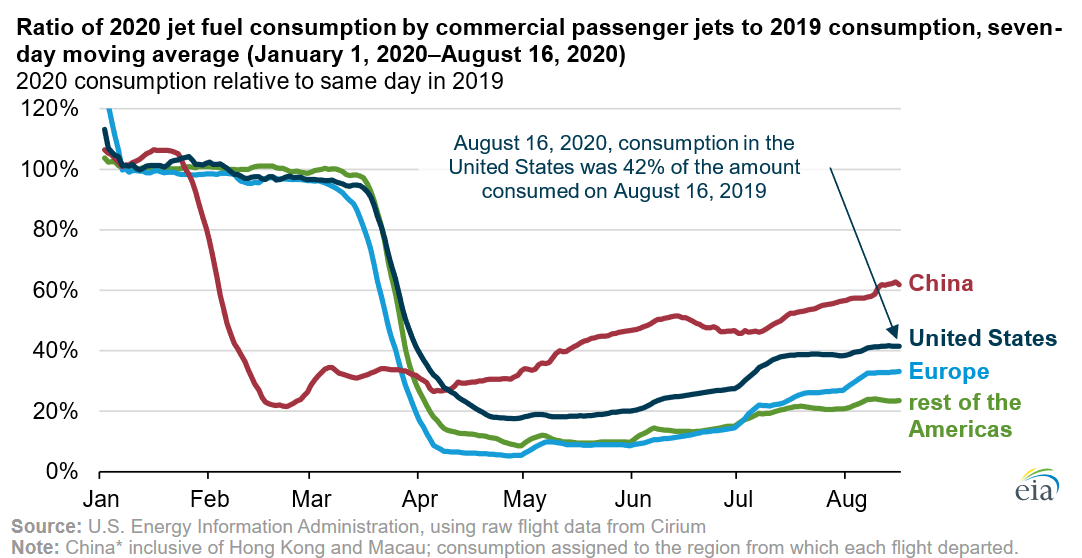
Change in jet fuel consumption by country relative to 2019

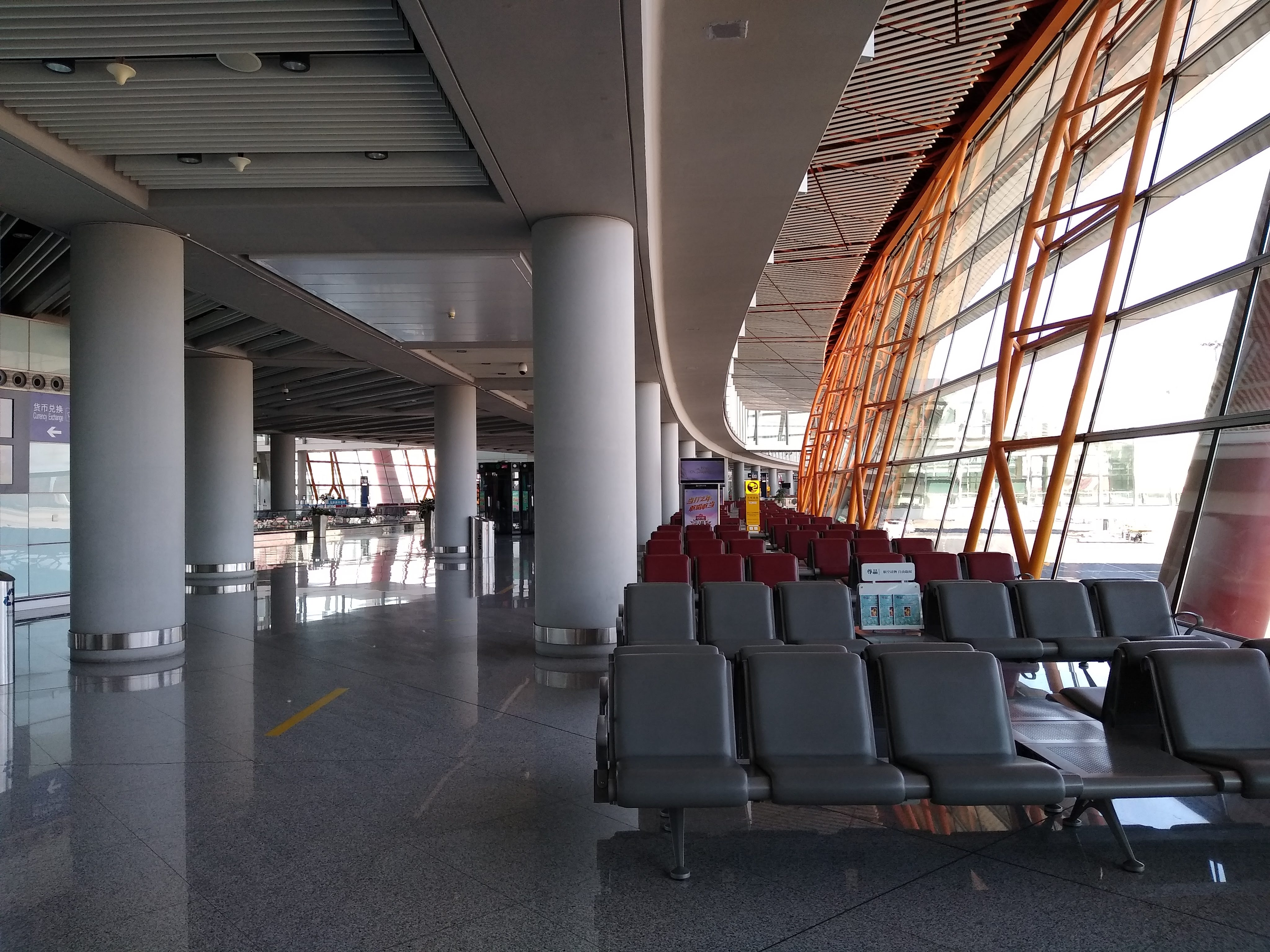
Beijing Capital International Airport, empty

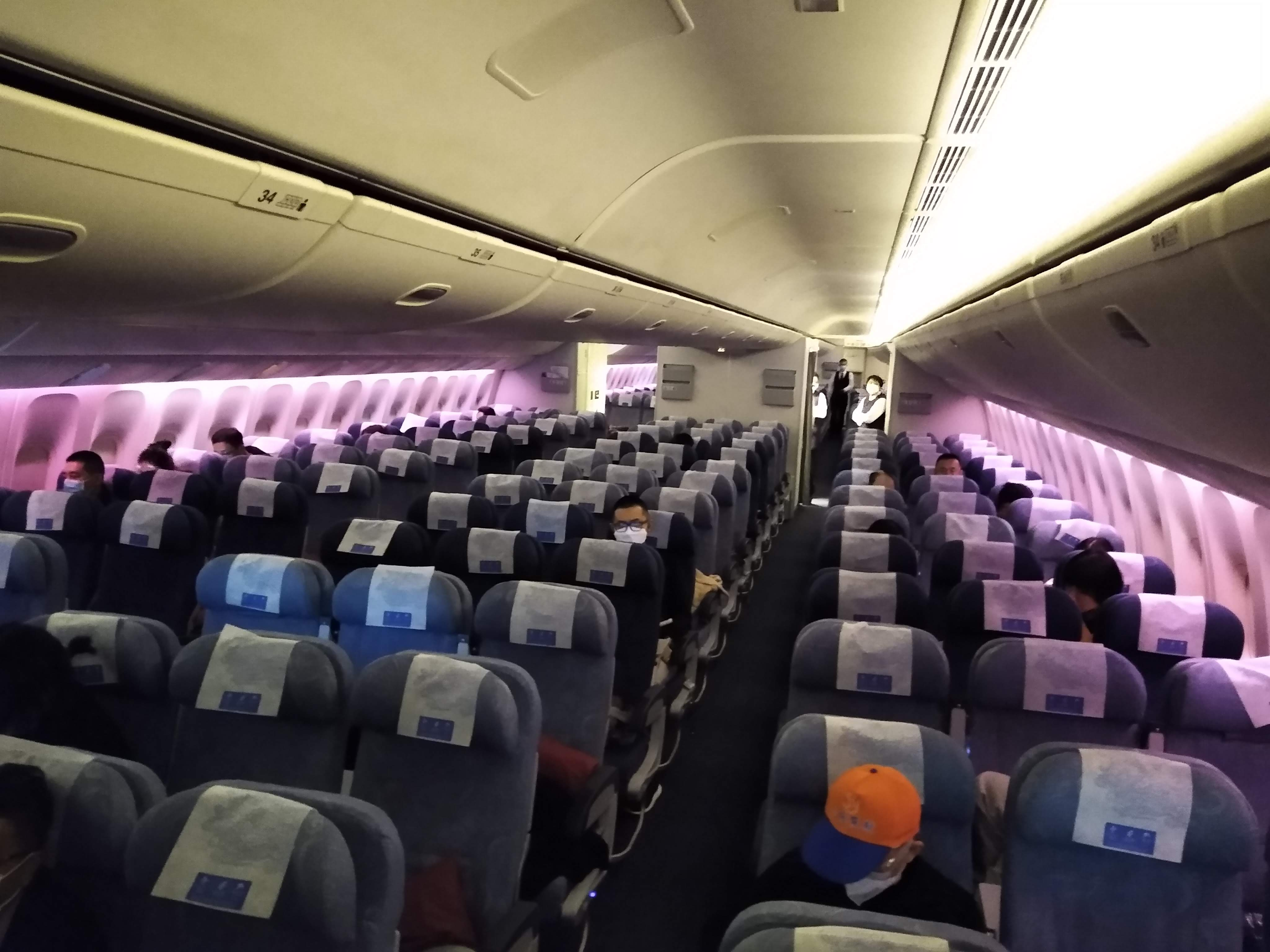
A nearly empty flight from Beijing to Los Angeles

- Argentina: The government suspended domestic flights in March 2020 during the beginning of the pandemic in the country and imposed restriction of international flights for several months. In June 2021, the government imposed a daily limit of 600 entries per day to prevent the entry of the SARS-CoV-2 Delta variant. On 3 July 2021, domestic flights resumed between some cities in the country.
- Australia: Australia closed its borders to non-citizens and non-residents on 20 March 2020, and from 25 March a determination under the Biosecurity Act 2015 barred most citizens and permanent residents from leaving without an exemption. Qantas cut international capacity by about 90% and domestic capacity by about 60%, grounded more than 150 aircraft and stood down 20,000 of its 30,000 staff. Domestic airline passengers fell 97.2% year-on-year in April 2020, and international passengers fell from 42.5 million in 2019 to 9.3 million in 2020. Caps on weekly international arrivals from July 2020, halved in July 2021, left inbound aircraft flying largely empty and pushed fares sharply higher.

Virgin Australia sought a A$1.4 billion government loan; the government declined, saying it preferred a "market-led solution". The airline entered voluntary administration on 21 April 2020 owing about A$6.8 billion, the first major Asia-Pacific carrier to collapse during the pandemic. Bain Capital completed its purchase in November 2020, after about 3,000 job cuts, the closure of Tigerair Australia and the end of its long-haul flying. Qantas announced at least 6,000 redundancies, retired its Boeing 747 fleet early and stored its Airbus A380s at Victorville, California.
Federal support began with a A$715 million package of fuel excise and aviation charge relief on 18 March 2020; more than A$5.6 billion was ultimately committed. The Australian National Audit Office found that the four largest recipients, all passenger airlines, accounted for about 91% of departmental support, with Qantas approved for A$2.13 billion (56.7%) and Virgin Australia A$1.08 billion (28.8%); because most measures paid only the shortfall between revenue and cost, actual payments could be lower. Qantas also received A$856 million and Virgin A$285.9 million in JobKeeper wage subsidies. Borders reopened to vaccinated travellers between November 2021 and February 2022, and domestic passenger numbers first exceeded 2019 levels in February 2024.

- Canada: Canadians were advised to avoid non-essential travel on 13 March 2020, while Canadian border was closed except for Canadian citizens and permanent residents on 16 March (Canada–United States border closed later on 18 March). Essential travel was exempted, and international travellers entered through Calgary International Airport, Vancouver International Airport, Toronto Pearson International Airport, or Montréal–Trudeau International Airport with mandatory 14 days' quarantine. The border closure was extended multiple times and remained closed until at least 21 August. Most transborder flights were cancelled from late March onwards due to the lack in demand. The prolonged international travel ban resulted in Air Canada's loss of C$1.75 billion in August and they urged for easing travel restrictions.
- China: Roughly two thirds of international flights to and from China were cancelled in February 2020. Flights between Japan and China saw a 60 percent reduction in traffic, while the US and China saw a reduction of 86 percent. Two thirds of domestic flights within China were similarly cancelled, numbering around 10,000 flights daily, while the ticket prices for remaining flights dropped—South China Morning Post reported that a seat for a three-hour flight between Shanghai and Chongqing cost as little as 29 Yuan (US$4.1). Passenger traffic between 25 January and 14 February dropped by 75 percent compared to the same period in 2019. Since 23 March 2020, all international passenger flights bound for Beijing are diverted to twelve designated first points of entry, under the Civil Aviation Administration of China (CAAC)'s guideline. Since 29 March, all international flights to and from China are reduced, with flight limit. Since 4 June 2020, CAAC decided to allow more foreign airlines to operate passenger flights to China from 8 June, while "circuit-breaker" measures would also be implemented.
- Colombia: Colombia ceased all commercial air travel at the beginning of the pandemic. Domestic flights resumed gradually beginning on 20 July 2020, Colombia's Independence Day, with a single flight of less than 200 km. El Dorado International Airport in Bogotá reopened on 1 September with 38 flights.
- Denmark: Passenger figures went down by around 99% in April 2020 compared to April 2019. This affected both domestic and international flights. Denmark closed its border to all tourism and other non-priority travel. Two noticeable cases were Aarhus Airport which had no passengers in April, and Bornholm Airport which had 16% as many passengers in April 2020 compared to 2019. On most domestic air routes car travel is possible with 3 to 4 hours' drive time, but Bornholm is an island where ferry and air is the only possibilities. See also: List of the busiest airports in the Nordic countries#2020 coronavirus statistics
- Fiji: In April 2020, Fiji Airways suspended all international flights and the main international airport in Nadi was closed. As a result, the national airline terminated more than 700 employees. On 26 May, the government issued guarantees in support of FJ$450 million (US$208 million) worth of initiatives aimed at strengthening Fiji Airway's cash reserves.
- India: Indian airlines are estimated to report a loss of US$600 million (not including state-owned Air India) for the January–March quarter. The government of India is planning a rescue package for the aviation industry for as much as ₹120 billion (US$1.6 billion).
- Indonesia: On 2 April 2020, Indonesia banned foreigners from entering their borders. Starting on 24 April, all passenger flights, except those carrying medical personnel/supplies or repatriating Indonesian citizens from abroad/foreigners from Indonesia, were banned. After implementing health guidelines, the ban on passenger flights was lifted on 7 May, starting with the resumptions of domestic passenger flights.
- Italy: Due to the outbreak and the ensuing national lockdown, thousands of flights to and from Italy were cancelled.
- Mauritius: As from March 2020 all international flights to Mauritius was suspended. The national carrier, Air Mauritius entered voluntary administration after making losses for quite years.
- Nepal: From March 2020 to prevent the importation and spread of coronavirus infection, all aircraft including domestic and international (with the exception of humanitarian flights) were banned arriving in Nepal.
- Pakistan: The Government of Pakistan had allowed domestic flights to resume, following suspension during the COVID-19 pandemic on 16 May. Six days later, Pakistan International Airlines Flight 8303 crashed in Karachi from Lahore.
- Philippines: The National Economic and Development Authority projects a loss of at least 1.2 million tourist arrivals assuming that the pandemic persists by June 2020.
- South Africa: South African Airways had been placed in bankruptcy protection in December 2019. However, with the pandemic leading to the complete grounding of all flights, and the government refusing to make more finance available, the airline is heading for a winding down process, or liquidation, depending on the outcome of negotiations with unions and workers on retrenchments.
- Turkmenistan: From March 2020 to prevent the importation and spread of coronavirus infection, all aircraft arriving in Turkmenistan from abroad are redirected to the Turkmenabat International Airport. Passengers arriving from outside of Turkmenistan are carried screened for signs of active infection, in particular, body temperature is measured. Visitors who are flagged during screening are transported to an allocated hospital. The airport medical center is equipped with personal protective equipment. After passing a medical examination, the plane, together with passengers on board, leaves for Ashgabat. Departures from Turkmenistan are carried out from Ashgabat International Airport. Persons authorized solely for diplomatic, official, humanitarian purposes are allowed to enter the territory of Turkmenistan.
- United Kingdom: On 22 February 2021, UK's PM Boris Johnson announced that leisure travel overseas will not start until 17 May.
- United States: Multiple airlines waived fees for flight booking changes and cancellations during the coronavirus outbreak following a request from Sen. Richard Blumenthal. Between 20 January and 7 March 2020, stock prices in US airlines decreased by 30 percent. Flight fares for domestic flights also dropped.

On 25 March, the United States Senate passed a bill that would allocate $58 billion in loans and guarantees to aviation-related companies, including $25 billion for passenger carriers and $4 billion for cargo carriers, plus $17 billion for companies "critical to maintaining national security", such as Boeing. The airlines accepting the package would be barred from increasing executive pay, issuing dividends, or buying back shares during the aid period.
On 3 September 2020, the CEO of the lobbying group Airlines for America said "We don't see it [demand] fully rebounding until 2024...Right now, we're fighting for survival."

- Vietnam: Despite Vietnam's success in containing the epidemic, Civil Aviation Authority of Vietnam (CAAV) said the aviation industry is in the worst situation in 60 years of development. Of the 234 Vietnam registered aircraft, more than 200 were grounded while airlines still have to spend hundreds millions dollars to maintain operations such as: aircraft leasing cost, paying for employee, aircraft maintenance and apron parking fee. Vietnam Airlines estimates its 2020 revenues could decline by US$2.1 billion. This has seen as many as 10,000 employees of the national flag carrier, over 50% of its staff strength, taking unpaid leave. Duong Tri Thanh, CEO of Vietnam Airlines stressing that the carrier was going through the hardest time in its history.

== Environmental impacts ==
The sharp and lasting decline in planned air travel throughout the pandemic had a beneficial effect of global climate change. The effects of COVID-19 lockdowns were subject of the first quantitative research on large-scale modal shifts and demand reduction in aviation. It illustrated that a significant share of business travel is not necessary and advanced or increased the adoption of various methods and technologies to mitigate air travel demand.

== Travel and virus spread ==
The use of aeroplanes by travelers has been implicated in the spread of the coronavirus. The World Health Organization noted that "Transmission of infection may occur between passengers who are seated in the same area of an aircraft, usually as a result of the infected individual coughing or sneezing or by touch". Amidst the coronavirus pandemic, many airline tickets have been sold at discount and some buyers attended spring break celebrations despite warnings to remain at home. A multitude of young adults have tested positive for the coronavirus upon returning from spring break celebrations; among those from Texas vacationing in Cabo San Lucas were forty-four positive persons.

Although a HEPA filter captures 99.97 percent of airborne particles, it does not account for air that does not go through the filter and many airlines have required passengers to wear masks during the flight. According to the US Centers for Disease Control and Prevention, pathogens do not spread easily on flights, but prolonged proximity still presents a danger of infection.

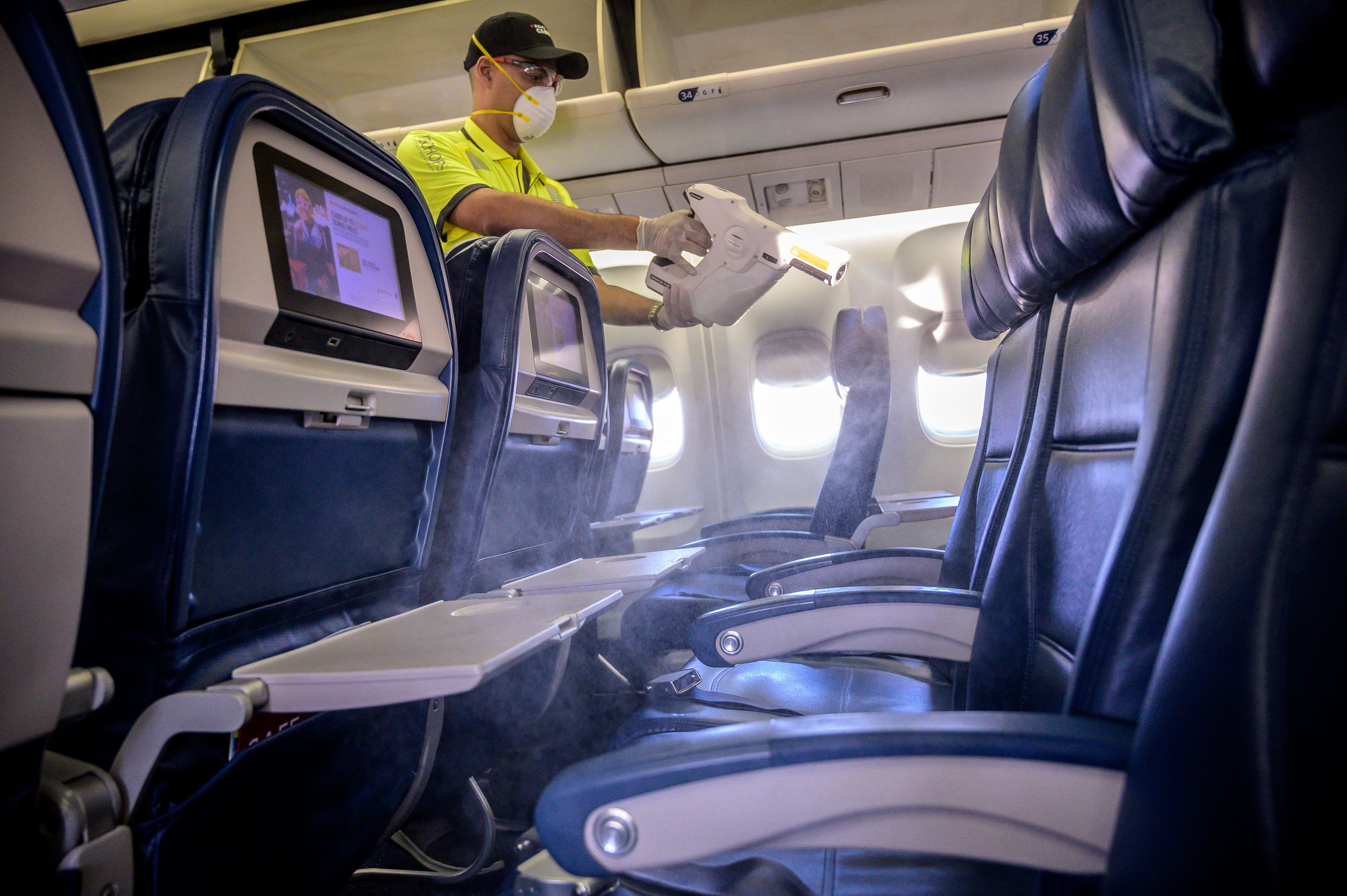
Aircraft cabin disinfection

== Hazard controls ==
According to the US Centers for Disease Control and Prevention, if a person becomes sick on an airplane, proper hazard controls include separating the sick person from others, designating one crew member to serve the sick person, and offering a face mask or asking the sick person to cover their mouth and nose with tissues when coughing or sneezing. Cabin crew should wear disposable medical gloves, and possibly additional personal protective equipment. Disposable items should be disposed of in a biohazard bag, and contaminated surfaces should be cleaned and disinfected afterwards.

== Proof of vaccination ==
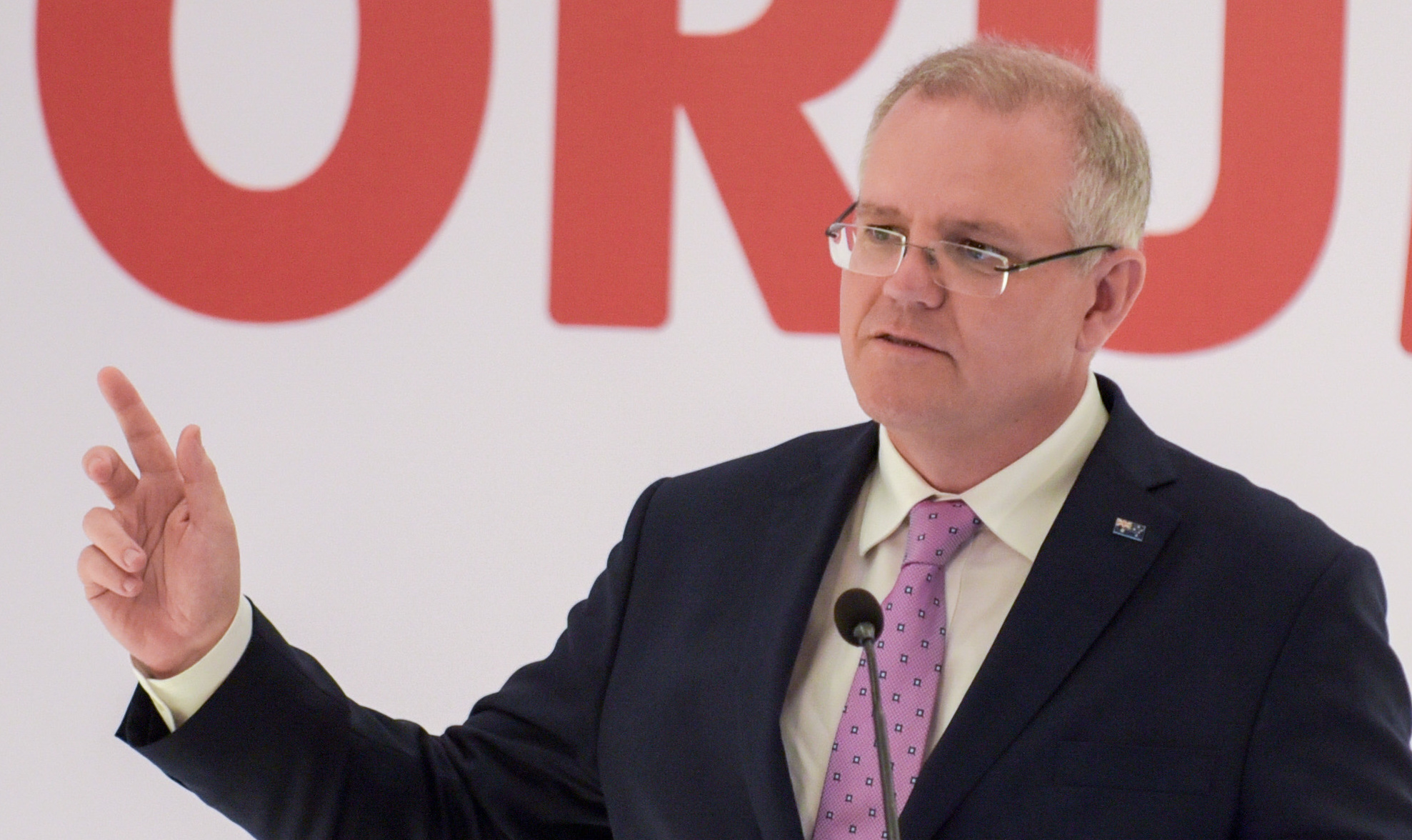
Scott Morrison: "People have the choice of two weeks of quarantine or being vaccinated."

=== For passengers ===
On 23 November 2020, Qantas announced that the company will ask for proof of COVID-19 vaccination from international travelers. According to Alan Joyce, the firm's CEO, a coronavirus vaccine would become a "necessity" when travelling, "We are looking at changing our terms and conditions to say for international travellers, we will ask people to have a vaccination before they can get on the aircraft." Australian Prime Minister Scott Morrison subsequently announced that all international travellers who fly to Australia without proof of a COVID-19 vaccination will be required to quarantine at their own expense. Victoria Premier Daniel Andrews and the CEOs of Melbourne Airport, Brisbane Airport and Flight Centre all supported the Morrison government's "no jab, no fly" policy, with only Sydney Airport's CEO suggesting advanced testing might also be sufficient to eliminate quarantine in the future. The International Air Transport Association (IATA) announced that it was almost finished with developing a digital health pass which states air passengers' COVID-19 testing and vaccination information to airlines and governments.

Korean Air and Air New Zealand were seriously considering mandatory vaccination as well, but would negotiate it with their respective governments. KLM CEO Pieter Elbers responded on 24 November that KLM does not yet have any plans for mandatory vaccination on its flights. Brussels Airlines and Lufthansa said they had no plans yet on requiring passengers to present proof of vaccination before boarding, but Brussels Airport CEO Arnaud Feist agreed with Qantas' policy, stating: "Sooner or later, having proof of vaccination or a negative test will become compulsory." Ryanair announced it would not require proof of vaccination for air travel within the EU, EasyJet stated it would not require any proof at all. The Irish Times commented that a vaccination certificate for flying was quite common in countries around the world for other diseases, such as for yellow fever in many African countries.

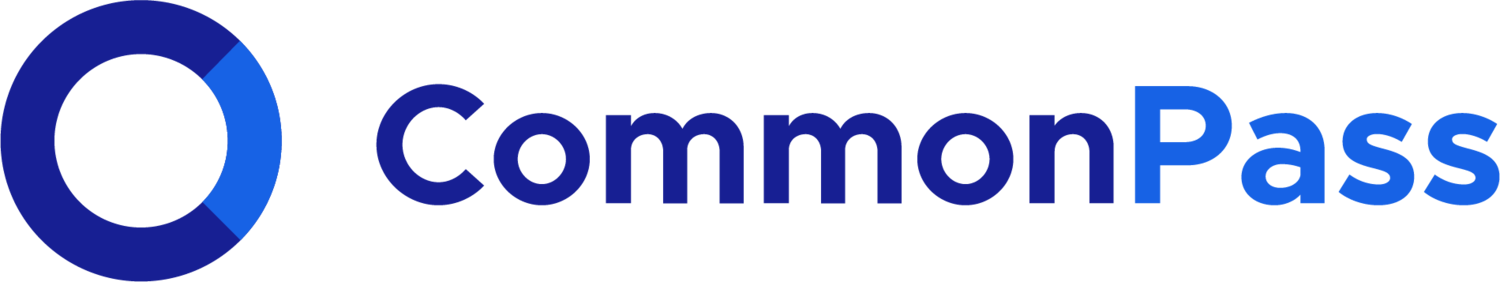
CommonsPass logo

On 25 November, separately from IATA's digital health pass initiative, five major airlines—United Airlines, Lufthansa, Virgin Atlantic, Swiss International Air Lines, and JetBlue—announced the 1 December 2020 introduction of the CommonPass, which shows the results of passengers' COVID-19 tests. It was designed as an international standard by the World Economic Forum and The Commons Project, and set up in such a way that it could also be used to record vaccination results in the future. It standardises test results and aims to prevent forgery of vaccination records, while storing only limited data on a passenger's phone to safeguard their privacy. The CommonPass had already successfully undergone a trial period in October with United Airlines and Cathay Pacific.

On 26 November, the Danish Ministry of Health confirmed that it was working on a COVID-19 "vaccine passport", which would likely not only work as proof of vaccination for air travel, but for other activities such as concerts, private parties and access to various businesses, a perspective welcomed by the Confederation of Danish Industry. The Danish College of General Practitioners also welcomed the project, saying that it doesn't force anyone to vaccinate, but encourages them to do so if they want to enjoy certain privileges in society.

Irish Foreign Minister Simon Coveney said on 27 November 2020 that, although he "currently has no plans" for a passport vaccination stamp, his government was working on changing the passenger locator form to include proof of PCR negative tests for the coronavirus, and that it was likely to be further adjusted to include vaccination data when a COVID-19 vaccine would become available. Coveney stressed that "We do not want, following enormous efforts and sacrifices from people, to reintroduce the virus again through international travel, which is a danger if it is not managed right."

=== For employees ===
An August 2021 statement from Delta's CEO revealed that "the average hospital stay for COVID-19 has cost Delta $50,000 per person" and that all of these hospitalized employees were unvaccinated. While Delta did not mandate vaccination, it said that unvaccinated employees enrolled in the company's healthcare plan would be charged $200 per month and would also have to be tested weekly for the virus.

== See also ==
- 2020 in aviation
- Epidemiology – Study of health and disease within a population
- List of airline bankruptcies in the United States
- Impact of the COVID-19 pandemic on tourism
- Impact of the COVID-19 pandemic on airlines
- Vaccination requirements for international travel
