= List of airlines impacted by the COVID-19 pandemic =

Impact of coronavirus outbreak on airlines

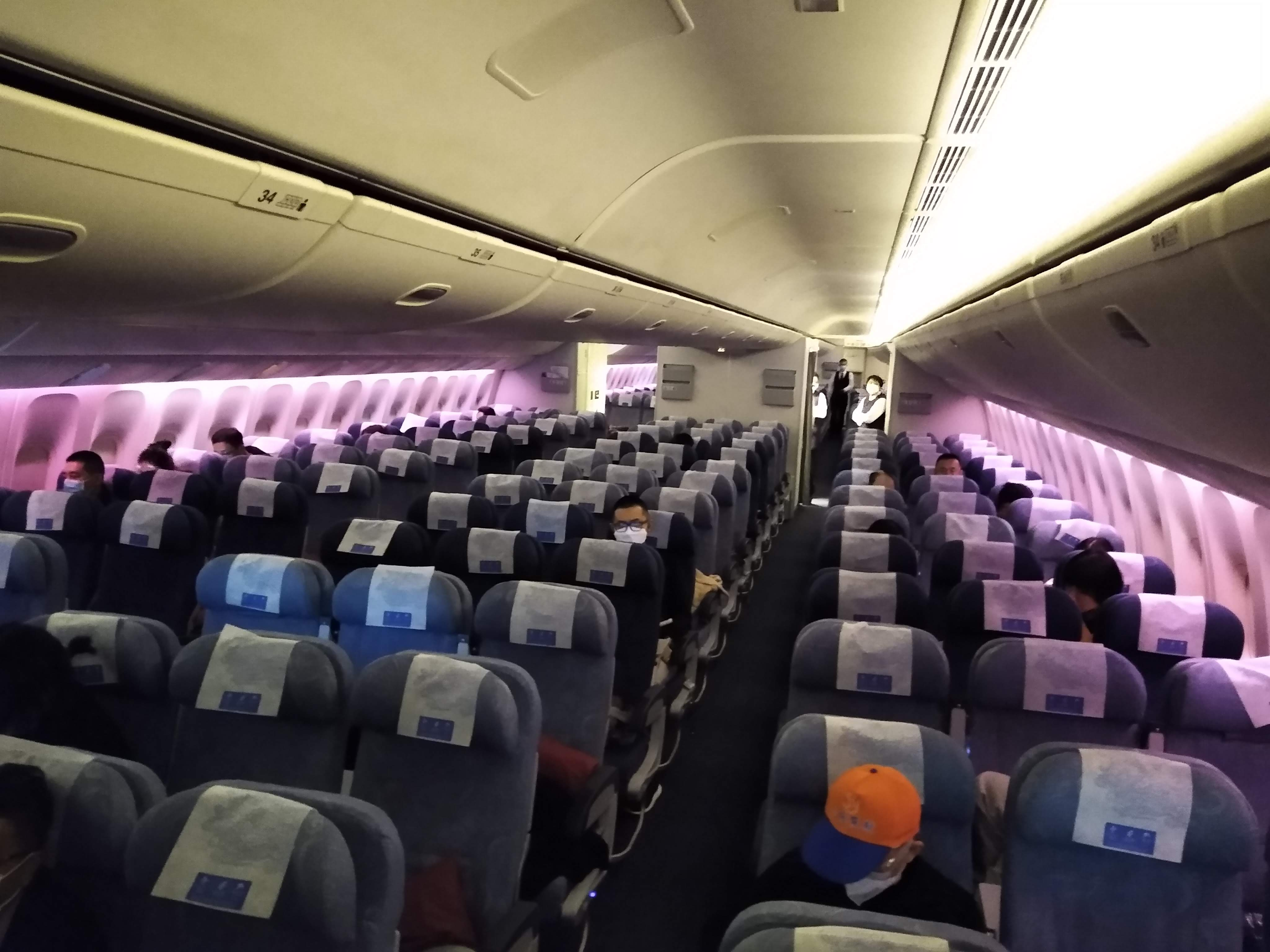
A nearly empty cabin in March 2020

Mirroring its impact on aviation, the COVID-19 pandemic has had a significant impact on airline companies due to travel restrictions and a slump in demand among travelers. Several airlines have declared bankruptcy, with some ceasing operations, while other airlines reported historic reductions in flights, as well as accelerating retirements of certain aircraft types, such as the Airbus A340, Airbus A380, or the Boeing 747. By 8 October 2020, 43 commercial airlines had gone bankrupt, and many more were expected to follow. In late October 2020, ACI Europe stated that 193 (mostly regional) of the 740 airports in Europe were also risking bankruptcy.

== Bankruptcies ==
- Avianca, the second oldest airline in the world and the second largest airline in Latin America, filed for Chapter 11 bankruptcy in the Southern District Court of New York on May 10, 2020 and liquidated its subsidiary Avianca Peru the same day. The court in New York approved the airline's reorganization plan on November 2, 2021, and on December 1, 2021, Avianca emerged from the Chapter 11 bankruptcy process more than a year and a half after originally filing.
- On 11 February 2020, Air Italy ceased operating. This decision was made following the shareholders' meeting of Air Italy (Alisarda and Qatar Airways through AQA Holdings spa). According to the airline, its flights were operated by other carriers according to the original schedule between 11 and 25 February. On 19 February, Air Italy reopened ticket sales for two public service obligation (PSO) routes, Milan Linate-Olbia and Rome-Fiumicino-Olbia, and planned to operate them between 14 March and 16 April 2020, the date of PSO contract expiry. The airline operated the routes until 3 February 2020, when the Olbia Costa Smeralda Airport closed due to maintenance works for 40 days.
- Turkish airline AtlasGlobal collapsed on 12 February 2020.
- British airline Flybe, already struggling financially prior to the virus outbreak, entered administration on 5 March 2020 due to the effects of the pandemic.
- Charter airline Miami Air International filed for Chapter 11 bankruptcy on 24 March and ceased all operations on 8 May.
- Trans States Airlines, the sister company of Compass Airlines, which is also on this list. On 17 March 2020, CEO Rick Leach sent a memo to employees stating that due to the impact of the pandemic on travel demand, the airline would cease operations on 1 April 2020.
- The Italian airline Ernest Airlines collapsed on 5 April 2020.
- Compass Airlines, a United States regional carrier that operated some flights for American Eagle and Delta Connection, permanently ceased operations.
- On 19 March, BRA Braathens Regional Airlines announced that they would reduce flight frequencies. Later, they decided to call for "a break." All of their employees in Sweden are temporarily furloughed.
- CityJet, an airline notable for its flights to and from London City Airport, filed for bankruptcy due to financial issues inflamed by the pandemic.
- Virgin Australia reduced 8,000 out of 10,000 employees (redundancies and temporary layoff). The airline formally applied for voluntary administration on 21 April 2020, however as of that date, flights are still operating and talks about the future of the airline are continuing. On 26 June 2020 administrators Deloitte announced they had agreed to sell Virgin Australia to American Private equity firm Bain Capital. This was approved by creditors on 4 September 2020, despite bondholders, Singaporean hedge fund Broad Peak and Hong Kong investor Tor themselves wanting to put a bid in to buy the airline.
- Air Mauritius entered voluntary administration to safeguard the interests of the company and its stakeholders after coronavirus-related disruptions made it impossible for the airline to meet its financial obligations. The airline was seeking to change its business model to address preexisting financial problems when the pandemic had a major impact on its revenue. The airline plans to continue operating.
- In April 2020, German Airways filed for insolvency with plans to restructure due to the cancellation of Eurowings' wetlease contract for their entire Bombardier DHC-8-400 fleet.
- Thai Airways announced plans to restructure the company under a bankruptcy court. Thai Prime Minister Prayut Chan-o-cha announced that the Thai Government, which owns a majority stake in the airline, would not allow the airline to declare bankruptcy formally.
- On 20 May 2020, the Ecuadorian government decided to liquidate TAME and ceased all operations. The airline, which had been struggling for several years, claimed that its difficulties were compounded by the impact of the pandemic.
- LATAM Airlines Group filed for Chapter 11 bankruptcy in the United States for the company and its subsidiaries in Chile, the US, Ecuador, Colombia and Peru on 26 May 2020. On 17 June 2020 LATAM Airlines Group announced it would cease operations of its subsidiary, LATAM Argentina, with all aircraft returned to lessors and all employees laid off immediately.
- On 18 June 2020, Level Europe announced that it would cease business operations with immediate effect and enter insolvency.
- On 23 June 2020 SunExpress announced SunExpress Deutschland would cease operations in 2020 and will be orderly liquidated. Its route network would be partially taken over by SunExpress and Eurowings.
- One Airlines announced on 24 June 2020, that it has ceased operations due to the hard financial situation caused by the pandemic. The owner and chairman, Claudio Fischer Llop, blamed the competition from SKY, JetSMART, and LATAM, which are offering charters at prices that ONE cannot compete with, and the lack of financial support from the Chilean government, making ONE's operation non-viable during the present and near future.
- NokScoot went out of business 26 June 2020 as it couldn't recover from the pandemic's impacts. The board of directors decided on Friday to liquidate the airline, which left 450 staff members unemployed. NokScoot return three aircraft from the five-jet fleet to the parent company in Singapore by the end of June.
- On 27 June 2020, the Prime Minister of Antigua and Barbuda announced that LIAT would be liquidated following a series of unsuccessful months due to COVID-19. The airline will be formed into a new entity that will provide vital connections between the Caribbean islands.
- The sale process of Italy's flag carrier Alitalia was accelerated, and the Italian government cut deadlines for interested investors to submit offers from 31 May to 18 March. Between the weeks of 2 and 9 March – when the Italian government announced a national lockdown – Alitalia's capacity in international flights fell by 22 percent. - Alitalia has now announced the final flight will be October 15, 2021
- South African Airways received several billion rand in government aid in early 2020, but the airline had already been under voluntary business rescue since 5 December 2019; stricken by preexisting debts and pandemic-related revenue losses, analysts commented that the airline had effectively "already collapsed" when the government rejected a request for another R10 billion in aid in mid-April. Business rescue practitioners gave the airline's unions a 24 April deadline to agree to a plan to wind down the company, stating that liquidation would commence if no agreement was reached.
- On 21 July 2020 Jet Time announced it had filed for bankruptcy, after having discharged most of its employees in June due to COVID-19. However, the owner expects and is preparing for a reconstruction in the new company Jettime, to resume operations after the pandemic. The Jet Time CEO, a number of key employees, and five of Jet Time's Boeing 737 airplanes are being transferred to Jettime.
- On 4 August 2020, Virgin Atlantic filed for bankrupt protection from creditors in the US. The airline sought the protection under chapter 15 of the United States bankruptcy code, allowing it to shield assets in the country.
- Island Express Air ceased operations and sold its assets to a group of investors.
- On 5 October 2020 the AirAsia Japan ceased operations due to low demand caused by the pandemic.
- On 21 October 2020 Cathay Pacific announced that Cathay Dragon would cease operations immediately, after publishing plans to cut 5900 positions across the group.
- Ravn Air, a regional airline based in Alaska, filed for Chapter 11 Bankruptcy, temporarily ceased all operations, and laid off all staff on 5 April 2020.
- Interjet, the third-largest Mexican airline, which only flies domestically and is based in Toluca International Airport, was reported to be near bankruptcy on 3 November 2020, after it shut down operations on 1 and 2 November and its personnel went on strike due to 2 months of unpaid wages. In March 2021, Interjet has officially requested to file for bankruptcy by the end in order to receive investment funds and resources.
- On 18 November 2020, Norwegian Air Shuttle announced that it would file for examinership in Ireland.
- On 3 September 2021, Philippine Airlines filed for Chapter 11 bankruptcy protection in a U.S. court.
- On 15 October 2021, Alitalia, having spent four years in administration due to financial struggles, ceased operations. Its operations and assets were transferred to new state airline ITA Airways.

== Mergers and acquisitions ==
In 2019, Air Canada was in talks to buy Air Transat for C$720 million but later revised their price to C$180 million in October 2020 due to the impact of the COVID-19 pandemic.

On January 24, 2020, LOT Polish Airlines announced that it would acquire Condor Flugdienst. On 2 April 2020 it was announced that the sale had fallen through due to the industry turmoil caused by the coronavirus pandemic.

In November 2020, Korean Air (more than 170 aircraft) parent Hanjin announced a W1.8 trillion ($1.62 billion) takeover bid for rival Asiana Airlines (82 aircraft) from Kumho Industrial, becoming one of the ten largest airlines in the world, as state-owned Korea Development Bank will invest W800 billion into Hanjin KAL.

== Reductions ==
- On 25 February 2020, Aer Lingus noted it had been advised by the Department of Foreign Affairs that travel restrictions were being placed on several Italian towns within Italy's Lombardy region as a result of the pandemic, however stated all flights would continue to operate, further advising all flights operated would continue to comply with guidelines locally from the HSE as well as from the World Health Organization (WHO) and European Aviation Safety Agency (EASA). On 28 February, Aer Lingus had been informed that a passenger had travelled with COVID-19 on a service from Milan-Linate to Dublin and that it was cooperating fully with the HSE and Department for Foreign Affairs. Four Aer Lingus Cabin Crew were also placed into self-isolation from the flight in question. The following day, Aer Lingus announced flight suspensions to Northern Italy, subsequently extending this on 10 March to all services to Italy. On 13 March, the President of the United States announced a European travel ban which initially exempted Ireland, however was extended to cover Ireland the following day. Aer Lingus subsequently announced network-wide reductions which eventually saw its network of flights reduced by 95%, the airlines plan for its biggest summer schedule within its history was scuppered as a result of what became a global pandemic. In a temporary measure, the airline confirmed it was cutting hours and salaries for all employees by 50%.
- AirAsia Group announced they temporarily suspended all operations.
- The Government of Latvia announced that airBaltic will suspend operations on 17 March 2020 until mid April.
- Air Deccan's CEO Arun Kumar Singh announced that all employees have been put on sabbatical without pay and ceased all operations until further notice.
- Air Canada announced a temporary layoff of 16,500 employees, suspending most of its international flights and cancelled all Boeing 737 MAX 9 orders However, most of the workers were later rehired under a wage subsidy program instituted by the Government of Canada. The airline later planned to lay off up to 60% of its workforce, affecting 20,000 employees, effective 7 June 2020.
- Air France–KLM's chairman and CEO, Benjamin Smith stated in a video recording to staff that the situation was "unprecedented". The Financial Times reported that the French government was exploring ways to provide the airline with cash. Air France-KLM later announced it would reduce capacity by 70–90%, as well as retiring all of the Airbus A340, Airbus A380, and Boeing 747-400 fleets.
- Air Georgian, a Canadian charter airline, began offering repatriation flights. On 29 May Air Georgian ceased operations.
- Air India Express Flight 1344 was a repatriation flight from Dubai, United Arab Emirates, to Kozhikode, India, for people who had been stranded abroad due to the pandemic, under the Vande Bharat Mission. On 7 August 2020, the Boeing 737-800 operating the flight overshot the runway at Calicut International Airport, killing 21 of the 190 people on board. Two passengers on the flight who survived tested positive for COVID-19 after arriving at a hospital after the accident.
- Air New Zealand cut its long-haul capacity by 85%, and suspended several long-haul routes. Domestic route capacity was reduced by 30%, and the company placed itself into a trading halt.
- Air Serbia temporarily suspended its passenger flights on 19 March 2020. It is projected to resume its passenger flights on 1 June 2020.
- Air Zimbabwe was forced to suspend all flights indefinitely on 26 March 2020. The airline was subsequently forced to put all employees on unpaid leave and is in the process of creating a post-pandemic masterplan.
- Alaska Airlines reported a first-quarter loss of US$232 million, retired 12 Airbus A320 family aircraft inherited from Virgin America, including all 10 of the Airbus A319s, and is expected to retire 7 other Airbus A320s.
- American Airlines cut its domestic flight schedule by 60%–70% in April 2020 and 80%–90% in May, with only a "handful" of international routes staying in operation. On 6 April, American announced that almost all flights to the New York City area would be suspended, and no crew or staff would remain in the area overnight. By 30 April, American had received US$10.6 billion in government relief, but was reporting pandemic-related losses of about US$70 million daily and US$2.2 billion total, prompting the retirement of all its Airbus A330-300, Boeing 757, Boeing 767, and Embraer 190 aircraft. On 1 July 2020, American Airlines plans to end holding open the middle seat in each three-seat row to enable social distancing, significantly reducing cabin capacity. On 1 October 2020, with the U.S. government relief program ending and the United States Congress deadlocked over its renewal, American began furloughing or laying off 19,000 workers constituting 16% of its workforce—to date, the largest job cuts announced by any airline.
- On 13 March 2020, Atlantic Airways announced the suspension of all routes until 13 April 2020 except the route to Copenhagen due to the pandemic.
- Austrian Airlines temporarily suspended operations on 17 March 2020 as a result of the pandemic.
- On 12 March 2020, Belavia suspended until 15 April its Minsk-Rome service due to the pandemic. On 14 March it was announced that connections to Ukraine (Kyiv, Lviv, Odesa, Kharkiv) were to be shut down from 17 to 31 March, to Larnaca Cyprus from 15 to 30 March 2020, and to Warsaw from 15 to 27 March 2020. On 18 March, were cancelled flights to Voronezh, Krasnodar, Kazan, Nizhny Novgorod, Rostov-on-Don, Sochi and Moscow Zhukovsky Airport.
- Earnings decline due to the pandemic, and Bangkok Airways has asked for government assistance.
- British Airways CEO Álex Cruz informed staff that BA was facing a crisis worse than the aftermath of the SARS outbreak or the 9/11 attacks, and wrote that "jobs would be lost – perhaps for a short term, perhaps longer term." After putting some 23,000 workers on furlough, on 28 April British Airways' parent IAG announced a restructuring and redundancy programme that could result in 12,000 BA job redundancies. On 16 July 2020, the airline simultaneously retired all of the Boeing 747-400 fleet bring the retirement date from the original retirement date of 2024. It also ceased an all-business class service between London City Airport and John F. Kennedy Airport and consequently retired an Airbus A318 fleet used on that route. In October 2020, Cruz resigned.
- On 16 April 2020, Vietnam Airlines announces that it sells its 49% stake in Cambodia Angkor Air to an undisclosed buyer.
- CargoLogicAir temporarily suspended services on 9 February 2020 citing a downturn in demand. However, services recommenced on 23 April 2020 with the high demand for air freight capacity, plus the downturn of oil prices due to the pandemic. They have regained their AOC on 22 April 2020 and started immediately with supply flights from China to the UK for NHS on 23 April 2020 with their two – in the meantime in Leipzig/Germany – stored B747-400 freighters.
- Cathay Pacific cancelled three-fourths of its flights in March 2020, compared to initial expectations of 40 percent. The airline cancelled 96% of passenger flights in April and May, but continued flying some passenger planes empty to transport cargo.
- On 17 March 2020. In an announcement, Cebgo announced that along with parent airline Cebu Pacific. They will suspend all operations from 17 March 2020, up to 14 April 2020, due to the Enhanced Community Quarantine measures implemented by the government over the island of Luzon due to the rising cases in the Philippines.
- On 15 March 2020, Cebu Pacific announced that all domestic flights to and from Ninoy Aquino International Airport in Manila were canceled due to the rising cases in the Philippines from 15 March to 14 April. However. They will still operate international flights regularly. 2 days later on 17 March, it was followed up by an announcement that the airline and its subsidiary, Cebgo, will be suspending all operations due to the Enhanced Community Quarantine measures implemented by the government over the entire island of Luzon to control the spread of the pandemic. Flights are canceled until 14 April. On 8 April 2020, after the ECQ measures were extended to 30 April 2020, Cebu Pacific announced that flights will remain suspended until the said date.
- China Airlines have shifted most of their operations to cargo operations, primarily carrying relief and medical supplies, as well as its proposition to change its name to "Taiwan Airlines" due to media confusion that the airline is based in Mainland China. The airline will retire all of the late-model passenger Boeing 747-400, as well as the Embraer 190 for Mandarin Airlines, in both cases without direct replacement of those types.
- Contour Airlines planned to serve Nashville, Pittsburgh and St. Louis from Indianapolis beginning 10 June 2020, however, the service has been suspended indefinitely due to the pandemic.
- In late April 2020, Corsair International announced that it would retire immediately its 3 Boeing 747-400s.
- Czech Airlines announced in April 2020 to terminate their sole long-haul route to Seoul, which will not be restarted after operations resume. Therefore, their sole Airbus A330 is to be returned to lessor Korean Air by October 2020.

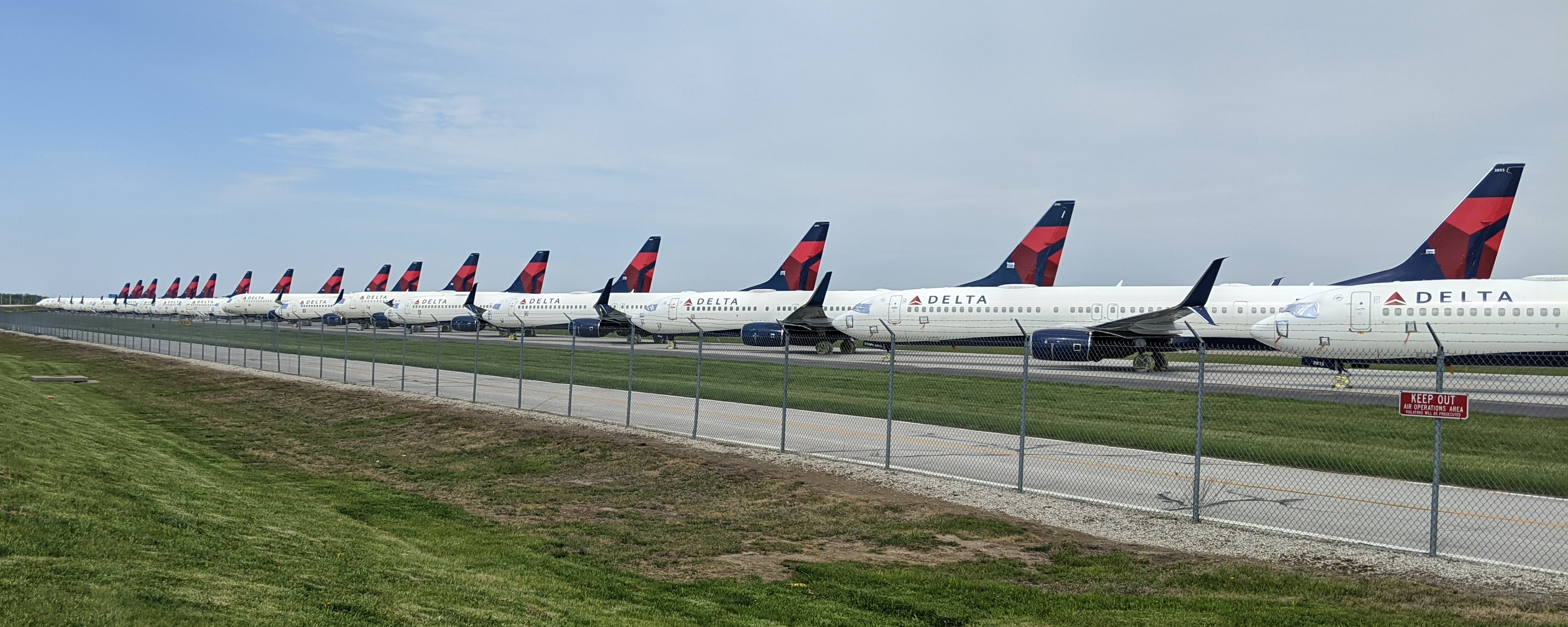
Delta Air Lines planes parked on a taxiway at Kansas City International Airport

- Delta Air Lines announced in March 2020 that it would reduce international flights by 20–25% and domestic flights by 10–15%. It also froze further hiring and suspended share buybacks. The airline in March reported a 25 percent drop in bookings, and CEO Ed Bastian remarked that the hit to passenger demand was similar to the impact of the 9/11 attacks on air travel. As of 31 March, Delta was suspending about 70% of its flights across its network. The airline will completely retire the Boeing 777, McDonnell Douglas MD-80, and the McDonnell Douglas MD-90 fleets to cut costs, in addition to plans to retire older aircraft, such as the Airbus A320 family, Boeing 757 and older Boeing 767. In September 2020, Delta Air Lines issued a filing with the US Securities and Exchange Commission and announced that the airline will retire all of their Bombardier CRJ-200 aircraft by December 2023 and both the Boeing 717 and Boeing 767-300ER aircraft types by December 2025 due to concerns of cash flow issues on the types leading to them no longer being profitable.
- EasyJet laid off 4,000 UK-based cabin crew for two months and sold dozens of its aircraft.
- On 23 March, Emirates announced it will stop all passenger flights, starting 25 March 2020. Passenger flights resumed on 21 May, though only to 9 destinations.
- In March 2020, El Al suspended operations due to the ongoing pandemic. The Israeli government had announced that all visitors and residents to Israel would have to undergo a 14-day quarantine upon arrival into the country. El Al also converted some of their Boeing 787 Dreamliner airplanes to serve as cargo flights to transport medical goods from China to Europe through Tel Aviv's Ben Gurion Airport. El Al also offered some passenger flights to get stranded Israeli citizens home. These flights went from Tel Aviv to Miami, New York, London, Paris, and more. They also offered 2 services to Australia during the pandemic. This was the first ever nonstop flight from Israel to Australia. El Al offered 1 flight from Tel Aviv to Perth and Tel Aviv to Melbourne.
- Ethiopian Airlines reported a 30% reduction in passenger traffic and a loss of $190 million in the months of February and March 2020. On 29 March, the airlines suspended flights to more than 80 countries.
- EVA Air grounded all Hello Kitty-liveried fleet, in addition to cancelling passenger flights, citing demand drop. On 1 September 2020, the airline converted 7 undelivered 787-10 aircraft into 4 787-9s and 3 777Fs due to diminishing passenger demand, although cargo activity has considerably increased.
- On 24 August 2020, it was announced, that ExpressJet would end operations on 30 September 2020. As part of the operational wind down ExpressJet has closed crew and maintenance bases at Chicago O'Hare and Newark Liberty International airports. On 30 September 2020, ExpressJet Airlines flight 4001 from Memphis touched down at George Bush Intercontinental Airport in Houston at 1:24 pm, parking 8 minutes later at Gate B87, concluding all ExpressJet Airlines operations.
- In March 2020, Finnair announced starting negotiations about short-term layoffs for all of its employees. By 10 March, 3,800 of its flights were cancelled in 2020 and Finnair announced it would decrease flights to European destinations by 20%. By 16 March, Finnair followed with an announcement to reduce its flight capacity by 90% starting from 1 April.
- Garuda Indonesia laid off 180 contracted pilots in June and furloughed 800 of its staff for at least 3 months beginning on 14 May.
- On 17 March 2020, Go Air suspended its international flights till further notice.
- On 19 August 2020, despite profits over the last two years, it was announced that Go2Sky would cease operations on 1 September 2020, due to the pandemic.
- GoJet Airlines, who provides regional service for United Express, on 4 September 2020 announced only 250 out of nearly 600 active pilots would remain on staff full-time. The rest will receive either 0 hours of credit or Furlough.
- HiSky was forced to delay their route launches several times.
- HKExpress has announced the suspension all flight operations from 23 March to 30 April 2020 due to the reduced demand caused by the pandemic.
- On 7 February 2020, as the pandemic hit many airlines hard, Hong Kong Airlines announced it was cutting 400 jobs – ten percent of the workforce, mainly pilots and cabin crew, and asked remaining staff to take two months' unpaid leave or switch to a three-day week. On 18 February 2020, HKA announced that it would suspend in-flight services such as food, drinks and blankets to help stop the spread of COVID-19. The next day HKA also announced they would be laying off 170 additional employees, mostly flight attendants.
- As of May 2020, all InterCaribbean Airways flights to all destinations have been cancelled due to the pandemic.
- On 24 March 2020, Interjet announced it would suspend all international flights due to the pandemic. The airline also temporarily reduced the salaries of its workers by 50% to further cut down its debt. A substantial percentage of their fleet has also been repossessed and grounded as of 3 April 2020.
- The International Airlines Group (including British Airways, Iberia and Aer Lingus) announced a 75 percent reduction in passenger capacity for two months in mid-March 2020. CEO Willie Walsh remarked that "there was no guarantee that many European airlines would survive". As a consequence, Iberia chose to phase out all A340-600s before the end of the year, as well as deferring deliveries of new A350s and A320s.
- Japan Airlines reduced 96% of its international services through 30 June.
- JetBlue is cutting its capacity by 5% and states the drop in demand is worse than after the 11 September attacks. On 11 May—after receiving a special exemption from relief funding provisions requiring US airlines to maintain existing destinations—JetBlue suspended service until at least 30 June to 16 US destinations, notably including airports in Chicago, the Dallas–Fort Worth metroplex, Houston, Minneapolis–Saint Paul, Philadelphia, and Portland, Oregon.
- Jet2.com announced it was cancelling all of its flights until at least 17 June 2020. Although it continues to operate repatriation flights for British citizens currently overseas.
- In response to the pandemic, on 17 March, Jetstar Asia announced that it would suspend all flights between 23 March and 15 April, grounding all their planes and asking their staff to take leave. This suspension was extended first until 18 May and then until 31 May. On 21 April, Jetstar Asia announced that it would start some flights but mainly to repatriate citizens and permanent residents to Malaysia, Philippines, Singapore and Thailand.
- Korean Air grounded four-fifths of its international capacity. On August 20, 2021, Korean Air announced that it will retire its Airbus A380 and Boeing 747-8 Intercontinental fleets by 2026 and 2031 respectively due to declining air travel demand and high costs.
- In March 2020, La Compagnie announced it will cease operations as of the 18th of that month, due to the pandemic. Operations are expected to resume on 1 June.
- Lufthansa grounded its Airbus A380 and Boeing 747-8 fleets, cut 90% of its long haul travel capacity, and announced it would ferry older Airbus A320ceo family aircraft, six Airbus A380s, all Airbus A340s, Boeing 747-400s, and McDonnell Douglas MD-11s to various aircraft boneyards (including Teruel Airport in Spain) to be decommissioned/scrapped, put in long-term storage, or sold to other airlines. Lufthansa will also cease all Airbus A380 operations at its Frankfurt hub. It also stated it would only operate 20% of its intra-Europe flights. It later decommissioned its local discount flights arm Germanwings, and it's leisure airline, SunExpress Deutschland.

On 11 June, the airline announced plans to lay off 22,000 out of its 135,000 employees, with around half the layoffs being German workers.
In January 2021, Lufthansa AG CEO Cartsen Spohr stated all the Airbus A340s will be retired permanently and also stated that the eight remaining Airbus A380s and eight remaining Boeing 747-400s (both of which are currently in long-term storage) could also be eligible for permanent early retirement due to the COVID-19 impact on aviation as both the Airbus A380 and Boeing 747-400 types are inefficient and unprofitable, after Spohr stated that future of long-haul air travel will be served by smaller wide-body twin-jet planes such as the Airbus A330, Airbus A350, Boeing 777X, and Boeing 787 Dreamliner. In April 2022, the airline permanently and prematurely retired its entire Airbus A380 fleet.

- In February and March, after Iran officially suspended all flights to and from China, Mahan Air continued flying to China and elsewhere. The airline lied about these flights taking place, according to an investigation by the BBC. Arrival and departure data from Tehran's Imam Khomeini and Chinese airports shows flights continued into March. A 6 Feb flight carried 70 Iranian students back from Wuhan to Tehran, before flying to Iraq the same day. Mahan Air claimed it had ended all flights from China after an Iranian student newspaper criticized the 6 February flight. But data from commercial flight tracker Flightradar24 showed 55 more flights from Beijing, Shanghai, Guangzhou and Shenzhen, lasting until 23 Feb (by which time Iran had 43 confirmed COVID-19 cases). The BBC investigation established that Iraq's and Lebanon's first COVID-19 cases originated on Mahan Air flights. Planes that went to Tehran from China also made onward travel within 24 hours to Barcelona, Dubai, Kuala Lumpur and Istanbul. From 6 February to 31 March, a total of 37 Mahan Air flights went to Dubai, 19 flights went to Turkey, 12 went to Malaysia, 8 went to Syria, and 6 went to Thailand. Cabin crew raised concerns about their lack of personal protective equipment (PPE) and containment measures on planes, but were silenced by the airline. Mahan Air claimed it was sending humanitarian aid to China and that none of the flights were passenger flights. The data shows that although six flights were used for aid, four others were used to evacuate Iranian citizens from China, and there were a total of 157 additional flights with China from 6 February to 31 March.
- On 6 April 2020, it was reported that Malaysian private equity firm Golden Skies Ventures had made an offer of US$2.5 billion to take over Malaysia Airlines during pandemic.
- Nepal Airlines the flag carrier of Nepal cancelled all domestic and international flights by 20 March. The airline's international travel restriction was implemented prior to domestic restriction. The government indicated that the foreign airlines can conduct evacuation flights at any time despite air travel restrictions. During the COVID-19 pandemic in Nepal, Himalaya Airlines carried out rescue and evacuation charter flights while all of its scheduled flights were grounded from March 2020. Nepal Airlines itself carried out repatriation flights to the Australian cities of Brisbane, Sydney, Canberra and Melbourne marking the first time Nepal Airways had operated scheduled flights into these cities.
- Norwegian Air Shuttle cancelled 85% of its flights and temporarily laid off 90% of its employees.
- For the first time in its history, Pakistan International Airlines operated a relief flight from Lahore to Melbourne, during the pandemic.
- Philippine Airlines cancelled 69 weekly flights to China and 17 weekly flights to South Korea, while exploring new routes to Australia, Malaysia and Indonesia to replace lost revenues.
- On 18 March 2020, Porter Airlines announced that they would suspend all flights from 20 March through 1 June due to the ongoing pandemic. The shutdown was extended beyond this date several times ultimately through 7 October as announced 4 August

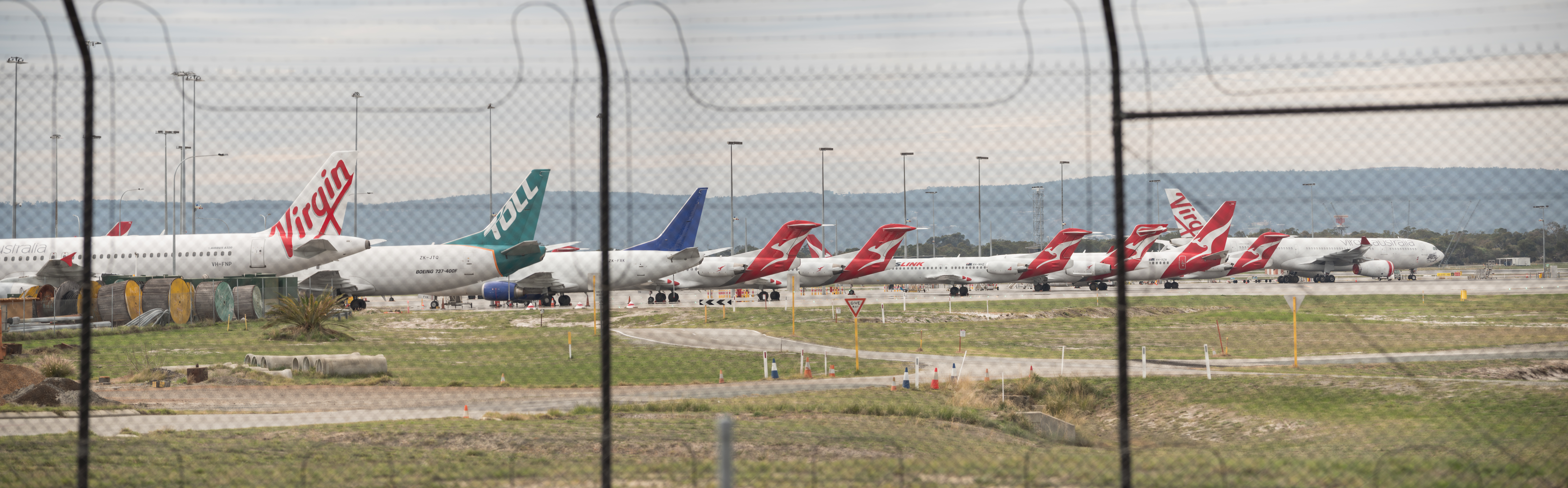
Virgin Australia, Qantas and Toll planes parked at Perth Airport

- Qantas initially reduced capacity on its international routes by around 25 percent and grounded eight of its ten Airbus A380 aircraft. On 19 March 2020, Qantas confirmed it would suspend about 60% of domestic flights, put two-thirds of its employees on leave, suspend all international flights and ground more than 150 of its aircraft from the end of March until at least 31 May 2020 following expanded travel restrictions. Qantas CEO, Alan Joyce, announced that Project Sunrise will be shelved indefinitely due to the pandemic and stated that it is uncertain if there will ever be enough business case to launch the project in the post-COVID-19 era. In June 2020, Alan Joyce stated that the remaining five Boeing 747-400ER aircraft will be retired by the end of June 2020 instead of by 4th quarter 2020 due to the pandemic. Qantas also stated that it is unclear if all of their 12 Airbus A380s will ever fly again and doesn't expect to return at least one of their A380s into service until at least 2023. It was also announced that 6,000 staff would be made redundant along with 15,000 staff who would be stood down for 12 months. This stand down of employees coincides with the cancellation of all international flights till 28 March 2021 with the exception of New Zealand. In August 2021, Qantas announced that it will retire two of its 12 Airbus A380s by 2024, while the remaining ten Airbus A380s will return to commercial service with new upgraded cabins as well as ease COVID restrictions on fully-vaccinated travelers. The airline will also require its entire workforce to be fully-vaccinated against COVID-19 in order to keep their jobs or will otherwise face termination for failing to comply with the COVID-19 vaccine mandate imposed by the airline for employees.
- Qatar Airways reduced fleet operations to 75% and announced that the Airbus A380 fleet might get retired by the end of 2020 instead of by 2028. Qatar Airways also cancelled all of their Boeing 737 MAX orders as the airline's Italian subsidiary, Air Italy (which Qatar has 49% ownership in) announced that it will be entering liquidation and cease all operations due to the pandemic. Most of the now-cancelled Qatar Airways Boeing 737 MAX orders were intended to be delivered to Air Italy. Qatar Airways also delayed deliveries of other upcoming aircraft currently on order until at least 2022. and make "substantial cuts" to their staff. In 2021, Qatar Airways confirmed that it will retire half of its Airbus A380 fleet by the end of 2021 and the remaining half of the fleet will be retired by 2028.
- Ryanair sent an internal memo informing staff that it may require them to take unpaid leave due to alterations in flight scheduling.
- Scandinavian Airlines has received a payment guarantee of 3 billion Swedish kronor by the governments of Denmark and Sweden to get through the crisis. Most flights scheduled for April have been cancelled. On 28 April SAS announced that 5000 employees would be laid off.
- Due to travel restrictions, Scoot only flew to two cities in April and May 2020: Hong Kong and Perth. On 20 May 2020, Scoot announced it would expand flight operations in June to six cities: Guangzhou, Hong Kong, Ipoh, Kuching, Penang and Perth.
- Shoreline Aviation ceased operations on 1 April 2020.
- During the pandemic in Nepal, Shree Airlines carried out charter flights to Singapore, marking the airlines' international flight debut.
- Singapore Airlines had to cut 96% of its flights up to end-April and ground the majority of its air fleet on 23 March 2020. Its management also took a pay cut and staff up to certain management levels had to take unpaid leave. Shares also dropped to its lowest since 1998 to the extent that they had to halt trading. In response, the Singapore government injected up to S$19 billion for the flag carrier whereas its majority shareholder, Temasek Holdings, said it would underwrite the sale of shares and convertible bonds for up to S$15 billion. On 26 April, Singapore Airlines flew their fleet of Airbus A380 aircraft to Alice Springs in Australia's Northern Territory for indefinite long-term storage.
- On 13 February 2020, South African Express, owned by South African Airways entered the Business Rescue process, a local form of bankruptcy protection. On 18 March 2020 the airline suspended all operations due to the virus. On 28 April 2020, the business rescue practitioners submitted an application to the Pretoria High Court for the liquidation of the airline. The court approved a provisional liquidation, with stakeholders being given until 9 June 2020 to voice objections before a final dissolution of the company.
- Southwest Airlines suspended about 40% of its flights in late March and stored 50 aircraft but denied rumors of pilot furloughs or bankruptcy. By the end of April, the airline canceled about 50% of its flights through late June, parked 350 of its 742 aircraft, delayed many Boeing 737 MAX deliveries, and was claiming losses of at least US$30 million daily. In July 2020, the company launched voluntary early retirement or long-term leave programs, and over 16,800 employees signed up. On 5 October, the airline announced pay cuts for non-union employees and senior management starting 1 January to avert furloughs, and said it would negotiate with its pilot and flight attendant unions for similar cuts, which the unions opposed. On 6 November, citing ongoing losses and stalled negotiations with its unions, Southwest filed formal furlough notices for the first time in company history. However, the Consolidated Appropriations Act, 2021 was enacted on 27 December 2020, providing $15 billion in airline aid, and Southwest rescinded the furlough notices and pay cuts. Southwest posted a US$3.1 billion loss for fiscal year 2020, the first time the airline had not turned an annual profit since 1972.
- Spirit Airlines was to cut fares by up to 70% and reduce April 2020 capacity by around 5%.
- Starlux Airlines has suspended all flights until 2 June and delayed aircraft deliveries of the upcoming Airbus A350s. On 2 June, the airlines resumed its three-weekly services to Macau. Amid the pandemic, the airline has also delayed its Cebu services launch twice and indefinitely delayed Okinawa launch.
- On 15 March 2020, Taos Air service for the remainder of the 2019–20 ski season was canceled due to the pandemic. On 6 November 2020, citing uncertainty about pandemic-related travel restrictions, the airline's parent company canceled service for the 2020–2021 ski season.
- Tigerair Australia terminated operations due to the pandemic, from 25 March 2020.
- Five ATR aircraft operated by TruJet were grounded by lessors due unpaid dues.
- Turkish Airlines temporarily suspended all international flights starting from 28 March.
- United Airlines announced that it would reduce domestic flight capacity by 10% and international flight capacity by 20% in April 2020. It also secured US$2 billion in loans to secure its cash reserves. United later stated on 15 March 2020 that it would cut 50% of its flying capacity for April and May 2020.
- Universal Helicopters, a Canadian helicopter company announced its closure due to financial insolvency on 27 May 2020.
- During April to early May 2020, Utair refused to refund tickets to passengers who can not fly due to quarantine measures. Class action lawsuit is in progress according to Airline-Inform site.
- Vietnam Airlines announced in March 2020 that it would temporarily suspend all international flights until 30 April 2020.
- On 5 May, Virgin Atlantic announced it was cutting 3,000 jobs, retiring all Airbus A340s and Boeing 747-400s immediately, and ending operations at London's Gatwick Airport.
- The British Government charted a Wamos Air 747 multiple times to repatriate British citizens in Wuhan, China, and Japan during the beginning of the 2019–2020 Coronavirus Pandemic.
- On 26 August 2020, Wings of Lebanon announced that they were to suspend operations, citing the pandemic and the economic situation in Lebanon as the reason for ending operations.
- Wizz Air announced on 4 March 2020, that it would be reducing flights to Italy and adjusting its flight schedule as a response to the 2020 coronavirus pandemic in Europe.
- WestJet reduced 6,900 out of its 14,000 employees (including early retirement, temporary and permanent layoffs, leaves, and resignations) and grounded at least 120 planes. All international flights were cancelled for a month. In July 2020, WestJet retired its entire Boeing 767-300ER fleet due to old age and disruptions caused by the pandemic, in favor of only using Boeing 787-9 Dreamliners for long-haul routes.
- It was, however, announced in April 2020 that the commencement of Zipair Tokyo would be postponed due to the pandemic. In May, Zipair announced it would start cargo-only flights of Narita – Bangkok as its initial route on 3 June 2020, whilst passenger flights are still suspended.

== See also ==
- 2020 in aviation
- Impact of the COVID-19 pandemic on aviation
- Impact of the COVID-19 pandemic on tourism
