= Preighter =

Passenger aircraft temporarily used for cargo

A preighter, also known as cargo in cabin, was an aircraft originally intended to carry passengers but which is operated temporarily as a cargo aircraft by loading freight in the passenger cabin. The term is a portmanteau of "passenger" and "freighter" and is attributed to Lufthansa chief executive Carsten Spohr; it came to use as commercial airlines responded to the 2020 COVID-19 pandemic.

A preighter is distinct from a combi aircraft, which has cargo aircraft features such as large outward-opening doors and a reinforced floor to accommodate oversize or heavy items, but has removable seats or is partitioned into passenger and freight areas.

== History ==
Prior to the precipitous drop in air travel caused by the outbreak of COVID-19, cargo capacity in the belly hold of passenger aircraft accounted for half of global air freight, rising as high as 80% on transatlantic routes. With the cancellation of many passenger flights and the corresponding loss of capacity in holds, existing dedicated freighter aircraft were insufficient to meet demand, and the price for air cargo increased.

Although passenger aircraft can be converted into dedicated cargo aircraft, this process may take years, whereas jets carrying cargo in the passenger cabin can be deployed much faster. With a loss of freight capacity and the urgent need to distribute massive amounts of personal protective equipment around the world in the fight against COVID-19, hundreds of unused passenger aircraft were temporarily employed in a freighter role. Such aircraft have also helped deliver mail, medical supplies, tools and other cargo.

In 2022, a temporary European Union Aviation Safety Agency rule facilitating the loading of cargo on passenger decks was allowed to expire, and declining air cargo rates rendered preighter operations increasingly uneconomical due to their inherent loading difficulties. On the same year, coinciding with the lifting of the travel restrictions and the COVID-19 pandemic coming to an end, many preighters are getting reverted back to passenger use.

== Operations ==
Preighters can be operated either by temporarily removing seats or, in some cases, packing cargo onto existing seats. During the disruption of COVID-19, at least 200 passenger aircraft around the world were modified to serve as preighters by removing most or all of the cabin seating. Cargo can also be stored securely between seats, in luggage bins or strapped down if seats are partially or completely removed. Limitations on where and how cargo may be safely transported in a passenger cabin may vary by the type of cargo.

Carrying cargo by methods not originally designed, especially when it involves reconfiguring an aircraft, requires approval of the appropriate regulatory bodies for the regions where the aircraft operates. The International Air Transport Association further advises that a comprehensive safety assessment be completed in all cases. In 2021, European regulators set a limit on total flight hours for preighters out of concern that carriers might underestimate possible increased fire risks.

Loading and unloading a preighter aircraft often requires more time and work by airline staff than would a dedicated freighter aircraft. The narrow doors and unreinforced floors in most passenger cabins cannot accommodate palletized cargo and large containers that can be rapidly loaded on freighters with large cargo doors and reinforced floors. As there is no dedicated system for loading a preighter, most of the process must be completed manually by airline or airport staff, increasing costs and placing preighters at an economic disadvantage to freighters, particularly when cargo rates are low. In some cases, the loading difficulties can take a significant physical toll on ground handling agents.

== Airlines ==
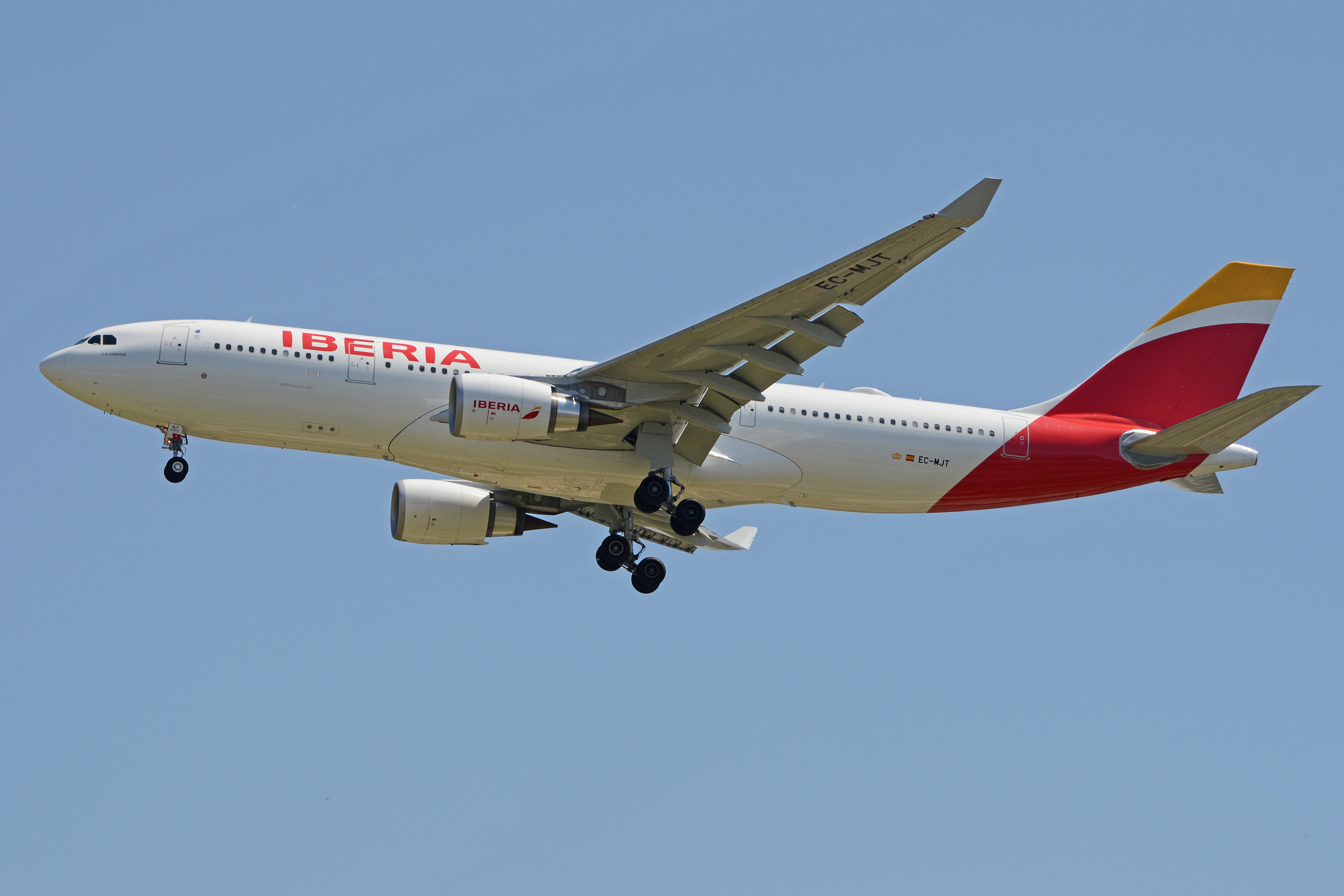
An Iberia A330 was repurposed to fly as a "preighter" in late 2020

Numerous major airlines have operated passenger aircraft as preighters since the beginning of the 2020 pandemic. Notable examples include the following:

- In February 2021, British Airways used a Boeing 777 aircraft to deliver 1.7 million masks to Germany.
- As an early pioneer of preighter flights, Ethiopian has operated over 5,600 flights carrying cargo in passenger cabins. The airline's use of preighters helped keep Ethiopian's entire fleet of 16 A350-900 jets flying throughout the pandemic.
- Saudia's first-ever commercial flight to Denmark was operated as a preighter service.
- A380 aircraft—the world's largest commercial passenger jets—have been used for temporary cargo operations by both Hi-Fly and Emirates.
- Korean Air flew the longest nonstop flight in the company's history as a preighter service in June 2021 operating for over 14 hours between Seoul and Miami. The Boeing 777 was carrying 15 tons of COVID-19 diagnostic supplies headed for the Dominican Republic and made use of both the cargo and passenger areas onboard.
- An Iberia A330, to be operated by IAG Cargo, was repurposed as a "preighter" in late 2020.

Additional carriers that have flown a preighter in some form include Lufthansa, Alitalia, KLM, SWISS, Qantas, Air Canada, Austrian Airlines, Vietnam Airlines, Cathay Pacific, Cebu Pacific, Delta Air Lines, Garuda Indonesia and United Airlines. Some carriers may even operate preighters after 2021 such as cargo airline MSC Air Cargo.

== See also ==
- Cargo airline
- Passenger-to-cargo aircraft conversion
- Combi aircraft
