= Boeing–Embraer joint venture =

Failed proposed aircraft manufacturing joint venture between Boeing and Embraer

Boeing Brasil–Commercial
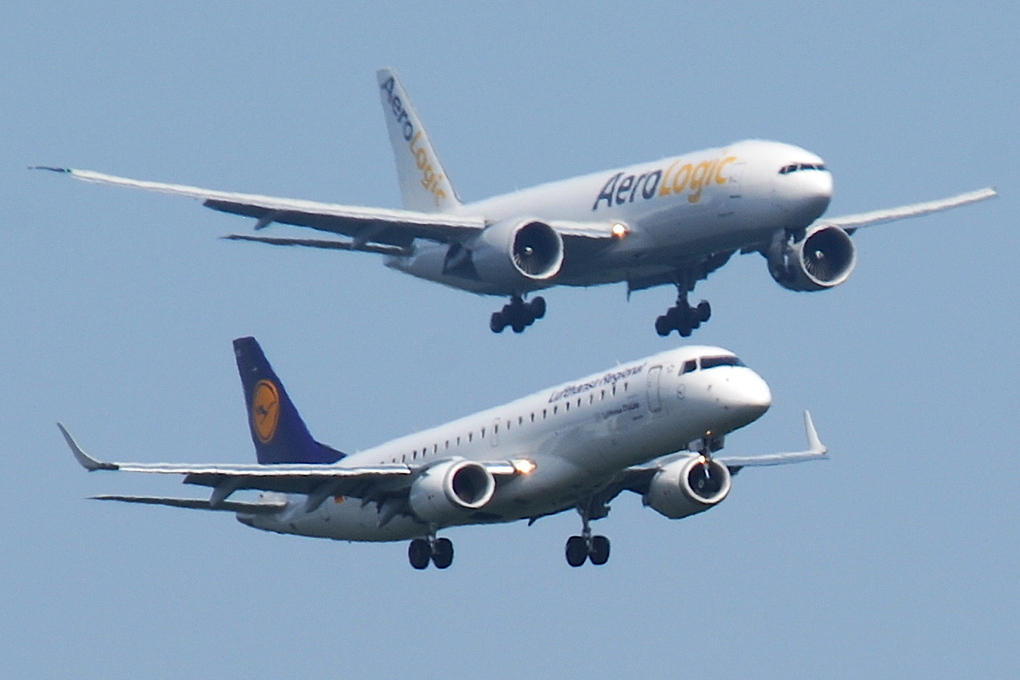
- An Embraer E-Jet E190 below a Boeing 777F
- Industry: Aircraft manufacturer
- Fate: Failed proposal
- Headquarters: São José dos Campos, São Paulo, Brazil
- Products: Airliners
- Brands: E-Jet, E-Jet E2
- Owners: Boeing (80%); Embraer (20%)

Boeing Brasil–Commercial was a proposed, but failed joint venture between Boeing and Embraer to design, build, and sell commercial airliners worldwide. The partnership was established in February 2019, after Boeing agreed to purchase an 80% stake in Embraer's commercial aircraft division. The deal was approved by Embraer's shareholders and was expected to close in June 2020 pending antitrust reviews, but in April 2020 Boeing terminated the joint venture deal due to impact of the 2019–20 coronavirus pandemic on aviation and market uncertainty. Embraer alleges that the financial impact of the Boeing 737 MAX groundings contributed to the demise of the deal, while others allege that U.S. labor and political considerations played a role.

== History ==
In December 2017, The Wall Street Journal reported Boeing had been in takeover talks with Embraer and was planning to offer more than the Brazilian company's $3.7 billion market value and was awaiting Brazilian government approval. The two companies confirmed that a potential combination was being discussed, with a transaction subject to approval by the Brazilian government and regulators, the two companies' boards and shareholders. Aviation industry analysts saw the potential deal as a reaction to the Airbus–Bombardier deal on the CSeries.

In the early years of Embraer, it was a state-run company and although it was privatized in the early 1990s, the Brazilian government retained interest in the company through possession of golden shares, which allow it veto power.

On December 22, 2017, Brazilian president Michel Temer said the sale of Embraer to Boeing was "out of the question", adding that the government was in favor allowing other companies, like Boeing, to establish partnerships with the company, but warning that it would veto changes in stock control. On December 28, defense minister Raul Jungmann opposed transferring control of the parent company Embraer S.A., because he believed that Embraer's defense business could not be separated from its commercial operations, but would welcome a deal maintaining local control of the company. On January 2, 2018, Brazilian financial newspaper Valor Econômico reported that the companies were now looking at forming a joint venture to avoid changing control of Embraer to appease Brazilian regulators.

=== July 2018 Memorandum of Understanding ===
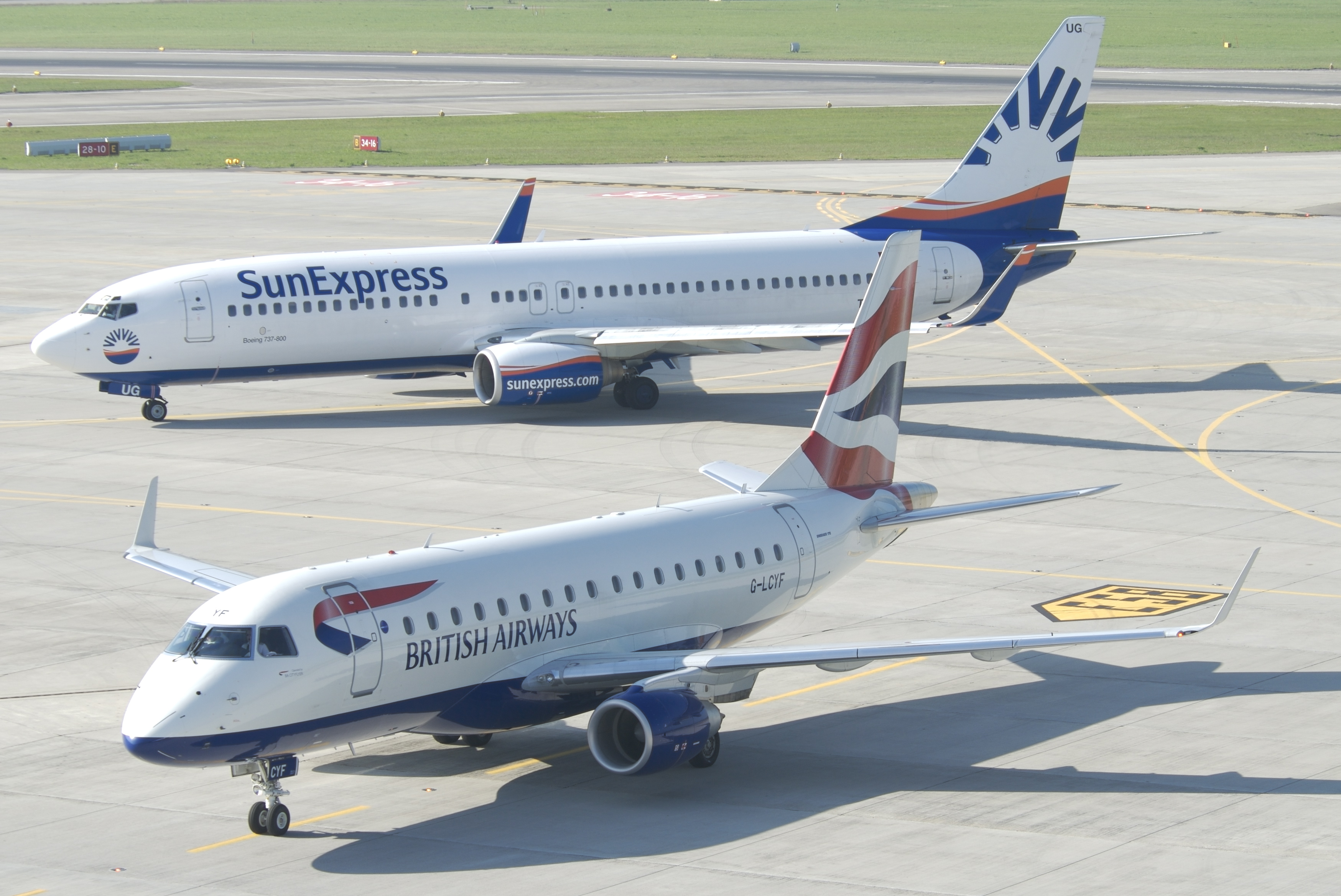
An Embraer 170 (bottom) pictured with a Boeing 737-800 (top). The E-jets are smaller than the 737, which is Boeing's smallest airliner.

On July 5, 2018, a Memorandum of Understanding was announced for a strategic partnership: for $3.8 billion Boeing would have an 80% stake in a joint venture with Embraer, which would produce and service Embraer's commercial airliners (the ERJ, E-Jet and the E-Jet E2), a business that at the time was valued at $4.75 billion and offer $150 million worth of corporate synergy opportunities. Under the proposed joint venture, Embraer would retain its executive business jet and its defense industry businesses, but the two companies could explore a second joint venture for the C-390 Millennium defense aircraft. Boeing would control the new company, which would be managed from Brazil with leaders who report to Boeing's CEO. A lock-up agreement would prevent Embraer or Boeing from selling their shares for 10 years. A put option would protect the minority stake value, allowing Embraer to sell its shares at the same price, inflation adjusted. At the time of the announcement, the deal was expected to be approved by shareholders and government regulators by the end of 2019.

Despite the proposed deal being converted from a takeover to a joint venture, it remained controversial within the Brazilian government. The lame-duck government of embattled Brazilian president Michel Temer opposed the deal, but president-elect Jair Bolsonaro, who would take office on January 1, 2019, supported it. The deal was also opposed by the left-wing Brazilian Workers Party, and four congressmen obtained an injunction from the Brazilian federal court Judge Victor Giuizo Neto to block the joint venture, saying that it would give away the profitable airliner division and would remove it from the Brazilian Government control. The following week, the injunction was overturned by an appeals court.

Aviation industry publication Leeham News noted that the deal would be good for both companies, as Boeing needed Embraer's smaller jets and Embraer needed Boeing's marketing power as the E-Jet E2 family was selling slowly, in part due customers were waiting for the joint venture deal to close, and the E175-E2 being too heavy to be sold to U.S. airlines due to scope clause limitations.

On December 17, 2018, Boeing announced that it was now offering to pay $4.2 billion for its 80% stake in the commercial aircraft joint venture, valuing the business at $5.25 billion. At the same time the two companies announced that they were exploring establishing a second joint venture that would market the C-390 Millennium defense aircraft.

Unions representing Embraer employees filed a class action lawsuit to block the deal on December 20, 2018, and Judge Victor Giuizo Neto again granted an injunction saying, "The brutal asymmetry in the shareholder structure of this venture prevents it from being carried out without compromising the survival of national interests." The injunction was appealed by Embraer and was overturned two days later with Federal Court President Therezinha Cazerta saying the case was outside the court's purview.

On January 10, 2019, the new Brazilian government approved the deal saying that it secured a new deal to "maintain the current jobs in Brazil" and a commitment to transfer production of executive business jets from the commercial jet factory in São José dos Campos to the Gavião Peixoto factory, where Embraer's defense business is based.

=== Boeing partnerships approved ===
On February 26, 2019, the partnership was approved by Embraer's shareholders. It was to be followed by antitrust reviews in Brazil, the EU, the US and China for an expected closure by the end of 2018. The joint venture should have $3.5 billion assets against $1.4 billion liabilities, for a $2.1 billion equity value. The price paid by Boeing was seen as very favorable to Embraer compared to the amount paid by Airbus for the CSeries. In March, Boeing named Embraer's John Slattery as CEO of the joint venture and B. Marc Allen, a Boeing executive as president.

On May 23, Boeing announced that the division would be known as "Boeing Brasil–Commercial," dropping the Embraer name, but had not yet decided whether to rebrand the aircraft as Boeing models. The joint venture also confirmed that airliner production would remain at the São José dos Campos factory, to be taken over by Boeing Brasil; while Embraer would move production of the Legacy 450/500 and Praetor 500/600 executive jets to the Gavião Peixoto factory.

The EU antitrust investigation was set to issue findings from its preliminary review on October 4, 2019, and intended to conduct a full investigation thereafter which could last up to five months. By then, Boeing and Embraer were expecting the transaction to close in early 2020. On November 12, 2019, Embraer confirmed the delay until at least March 2020. In January 2020, the partnership was approved by Brazilian authorities, and only the European Commission approval was lacking. By March 2020, the deal was not expected to close before June 23, 2020.

On November 18, 2019, the two companies officially announced a second joint venture known as "Boeing Embraer – Defense" to promote and develop new markets for the C-390 Millennium. Embraer would keep a 51% stake in this proposed joint venture, which would also need to be approved by shareholders and government regulators

=== Termination ===
Boeing terminated the planned joint ventures on April 24, 2020, saying that Embraer did not satisfy the conditions established in their agreement. Industry analysts said that the $4.2 billion deal became unbalanced as Embraer's market value fell to less than $1.1 billion as air travel demand dropped as a result of the impact of the 2019–20 coronavirus pandemic on aviation. Industry analysts speculated that Boeing may have also cancelled the deal because it had recently been awarded a U.S. government pandemic relief loan, and wanted to avoid making the impression that funds intended to support U.S. jobs were instead used to secure a deal with a Brazilian firm.

Embraer has rejected Boeing's reasons for the termination of the deal and said the company "has manufactured false claims as a pretext to seek to avoid its commitments" because of its financial condition after the 737 MAX groundings and "other business and reputational problems." Embraer threatened to pursue "all remedies against Boeing for the damages incurred." The agreement had a termination fee of $75 million according to a copy of the merger agreement filed to U.S. authorities. Industry analysts also believe that Embraer may file suit to recover the $100–120 million it spent separating its commercial and military units, and claim lost business opportunities as orders for new jets were slow while customers were waiting for the deal to close.

Despite the termination of the two joint ventures, the agreement relating to marketing of the C-390 military aircraft remains, though analysts say the prospects of international sales facilitated by Boeing have diminished.

==== Asian alternative ====
Hamilton Mourão, Vice President of Brazil, proposed an alternative partnership with China. Teal Group aerospace analyst Richard Aboulafia was doubtful the partnership could work, while Ascend global consultancy reckons going with China could get Embraer's foot in the door.

=== Arbitration ===
In September 2024, the companies reached an agreement ("collar agreement") of 150 million dollars (around 825 million reais) for Boeing's decision to withdraw from negotiations in 2020. Boeing confirmed that an agreement had been reached, without mentioning the amount to be paid. As this is an arbitration agreement, there is no provision for the parties to appeal the decision. Analysts at JPMorgan said that the amount was below expectations, noting that the forecast was for a settlement of between 300 million and 400 million dollars.
