= David Estrada =

David Estrada may refer to:

- David Estrada (boxer) (born 1978), Guatemalan-American boxer
- David Estrada (lawyer) (born 1968), autonomous vehicle lawyer
- David Estrada (soccer) (born 1988), Mexican footballer
