= Wisk Cora =

American personal electric aircraft

Cora
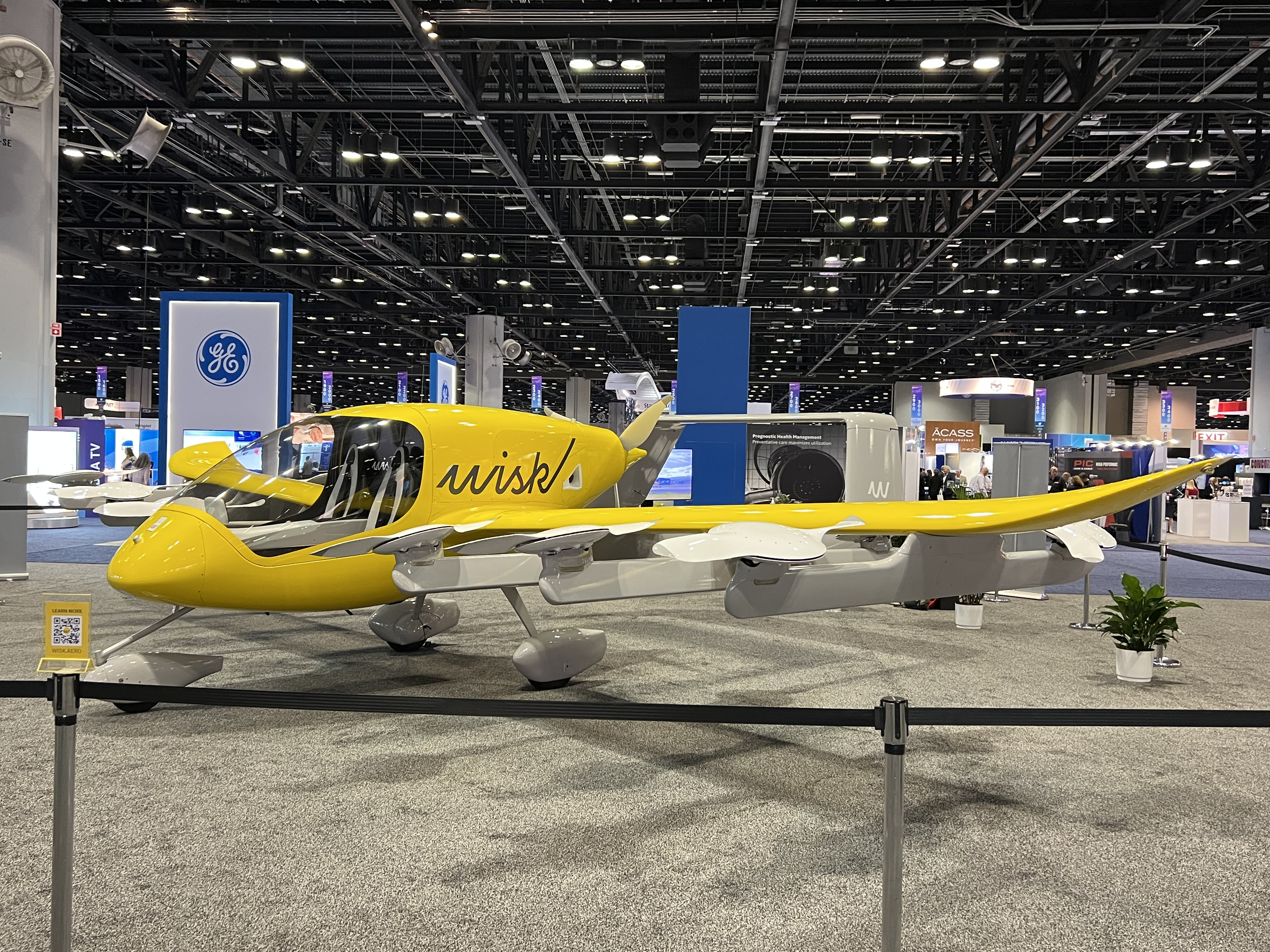
- Generation 5 Cora at 2022 NBAA-BACE

General information
- Type: Personal air vehicle
- National origin: United States
- Manufacturer: Wisk Aero
- Status: Under development

History
- First flight: March 13, 2018
- Developed from: Zee Aero Z-P2

The Wisk Cora, also known as Generation 4 and Generation 5, is an American autonomous personal air vehicle prototype previously developed by the Kitty Hawk Corporation, and subsequently by Wisk Aero.

== History ==
The Kitty Hawk Corporation first presented the Cora publicly in March 2018. The company is named after the location near which the Wright brothers' first powered flight took place. The Cora is a two-seater development of the Zee Aero Z-P2. The individual approvals of the Cora by the Federal Aviation Administration (FAA) were done under the name Zee Aero Mule SPA, then as Kitty Hawk Mule SPA. The development, testing and operation takes place in collaboration with the New Zealand subsidiary Zephyr Airworks, founded by Kitty Hawk in December 2016.

In June 2019 the Kitty Hawk Corporation and Boeing agreed to collaborate in the field of urban air mobility. For this purpose, a company called Wisk Aero LLC was founded on December 2, 2019. Zephyr Airworks became Wisk New Zealand. After approval by the government, a trial operation with the Cora took place in New Zealand in February 2020. With the termination of BoeingNeXT operations in mid-2020, some doubt existed on the continued relationship between Wisk and Boeing.

By 2021 Zephyr Airworks planned to set up an air taxi service in New Zealand. It is planned that the aircraft will only be used for the flight service planned in cooperation with Air New Zealand.

In January 2022, Wisk Aero announced a $450 million investment by Boeing, to further develop the Wisk Cora pilot-less flying taxis.

The Cora made its first public flight demonstration at the EAA AirVenture Oshkosh on July 25, 2023.

== Design ==
The Cora has 12 electric motors for hovering at two fixed wings, each with 6 propellers (with near vertical axis), three in front of the wing and three behind. For horizontal flight there is a separately driven pressure propeller. An overall rescue system is provided for emergencies. The first flight was on March 13, 2018, in Mountain View, California.

== Variants ==
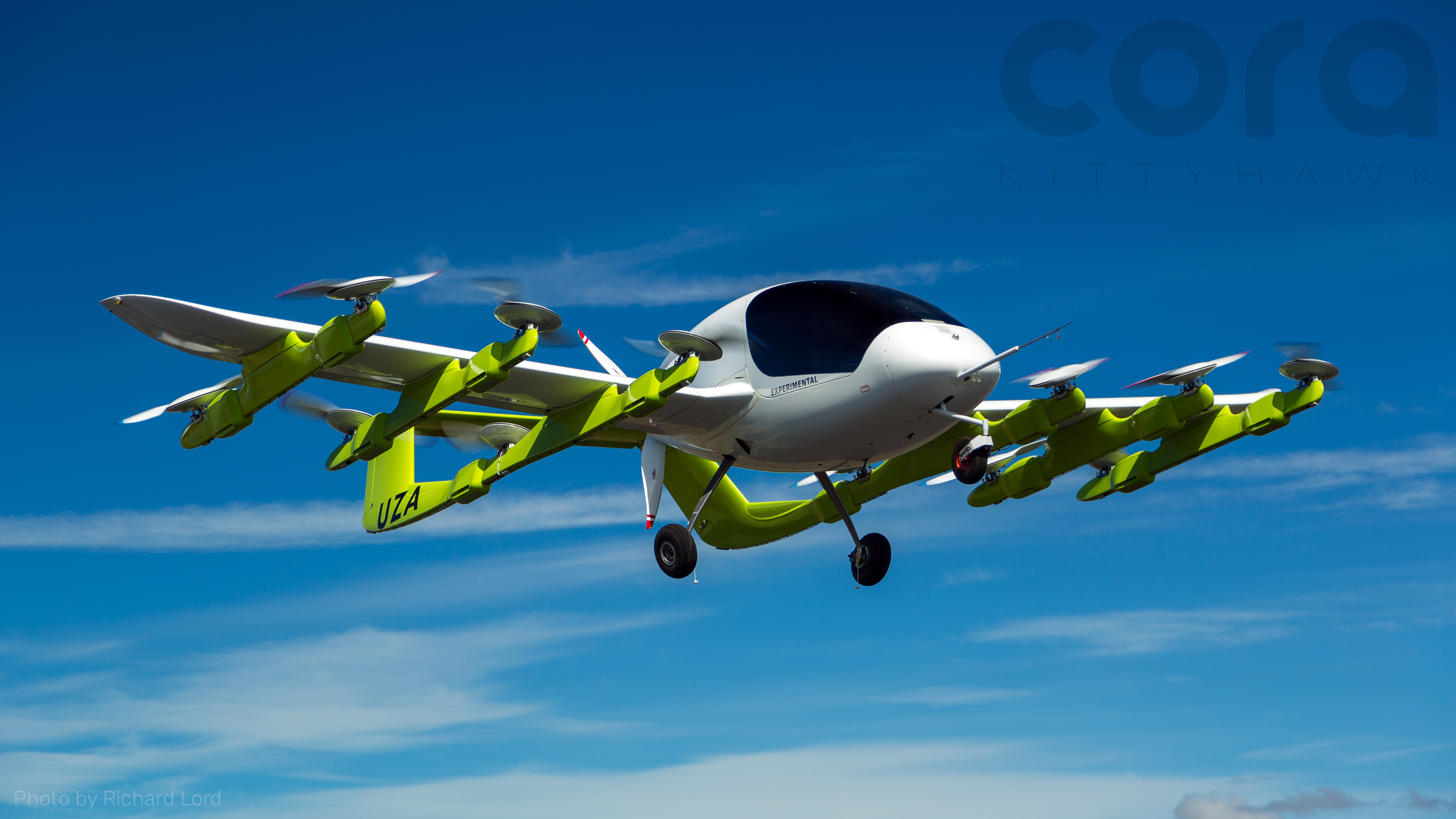
Generation 4 Cora in flight

Generation 4
The first Cora variant and the fourth Wisk aircraft overall.
Generation 5
Improved version of the Generation 4 with redesigned tail booms and improved internal systems.

== Specifications (Generation 4) ==
Data from TransportUP

General characteristics

- Crew: None (autopilot)
- Capacity: 2 passengers, 180 kg (400 lb) payload
- Length: 19 ft 8 in (6 m)
- Wingspan: 36 ft 1 in (11 m)
- Powerplant: 1 × horizontal electric
- Powerplant: 12 × vertical electric

Performance

- Cruise speed: 110 mph (180 km/h, 97 kn)
- Range: 62 mi (100 km, 54 nmi)
- Service ceiling: 3,000 ft (900 m)

== See also ==
- Air taxi

Aircraft of comparable role, configuration, and era

- CityAirbus
- Boeing PAV
- Lilium Jet
- Opener BlackFly
- Beta Technologies Alia

Related lists

- List of electric aircraft
