= David Estrada (lawyer) =

American lawyer

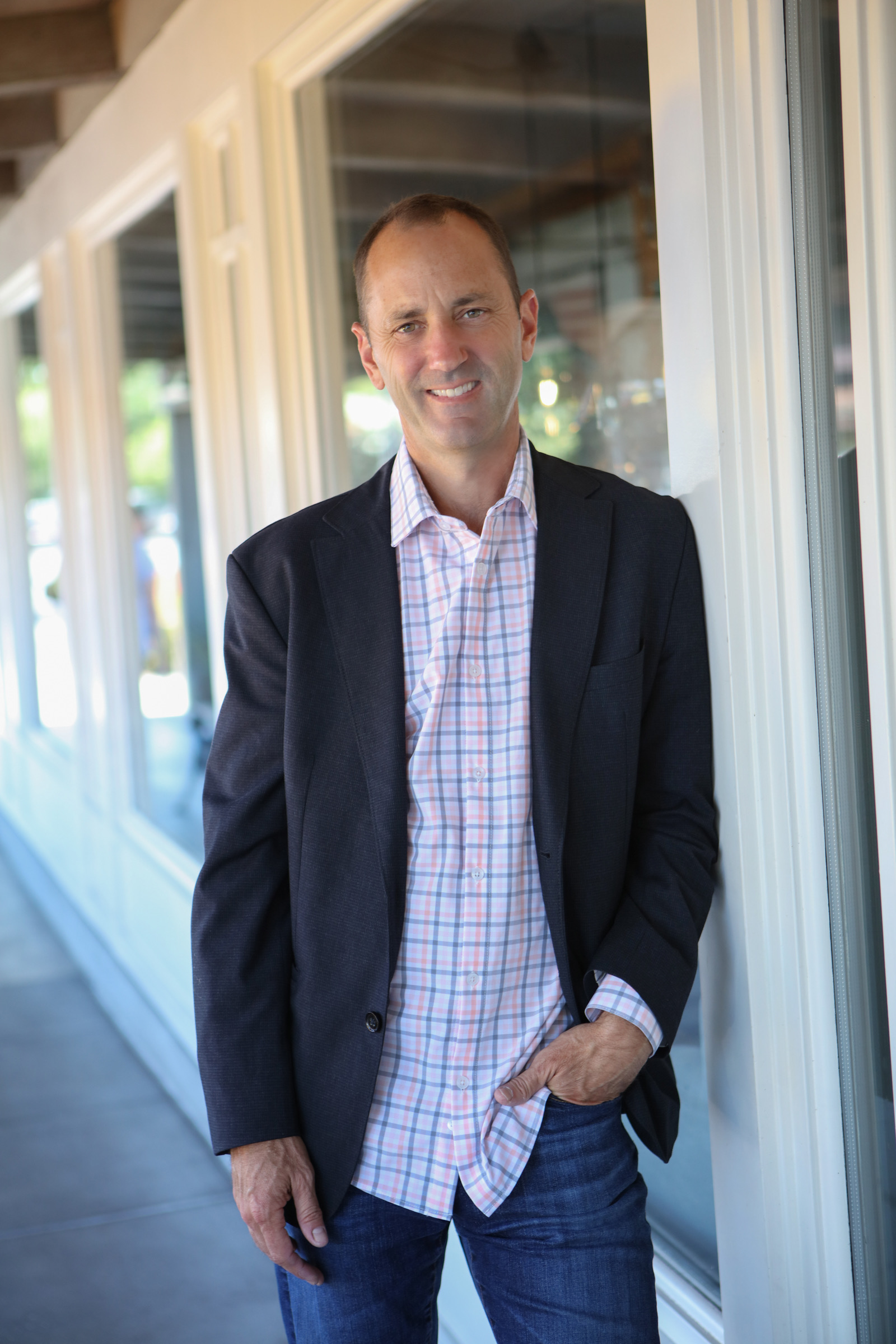
- Born: March 28, 1968 (age 57)
- Education: University of California, Santa Barbara (B.A.); University of California, Berkeley (J.D.)
- Occupation: Lawyer
- Known for: Chief legal and policy officer at Nuro Inc.

David Estrada (born March 28, 1968) is a Silicon Valley lawyer and policy advisor.

== Life and education ==
He is married to Gina Estrada and the couple have three children.

Estrada is a 1993 graduate of the UC Berkeley School of Law, where he was an articles editor for the Berkeley Technology Law Journal, a judicial extern for Judge Charles A. Legge of the Northern District of California, and taught a class called Street Law to empower high school students with legal tools.

== Career ==
In the early days of the rideshare industry at Lyft in 2014, he built the government relations team and helped develop state laws for the industry during its battles with taxi interests. At Google X he shaped the first state-level autonomous vehicle regulations in Nevada, Florida, and California, and he spoke about the benefits of self-driving cars at a Computer History Museum event called Reinventing Law in 2013. When he joined Nuro in 2019 he was cited for asserting that autonomous vehicles used for goods delivery, like Nuro's, do not need steering wheels or seat belts. The National Highway Traffic Safety Administration later granted Nuro an exemption from certain traditional safety standards for its low speed autonomous delivery vehicle with no capacity for holding passengers. “Since this is a low-speed self-driving delivery vehicle, certain features that the Department traditionally required – such as mirrors and a windshield for vehicles carrying drivers – no longer make sense,” said U.S. Secretary of Transportation Elaine L. Chao. Nuro went on to receive the first full commercial deployment permit for an autonomous vehicle from the state of California Department of Motor Vehicles. “Issuing the first deployment permit is a significant milestone in the evolution of autonomous vehicles in California,” DMV Director Steve Gordon said. “We will continue to keep the safety of the motoring public in mind as this technology develops.” Despite achieving these significant milestones, Nuro changed course to pursue a robotaxi service instead of goods delivery, partnering in 2025 with Uber and Lucid to develop its first robotaxi vehicle.

Estrada worked with Sebastian Thrun to build the Kitty Hawk Corporation, a flying car company which launched a one-person VTOL aircraft called the Flyer. He sat on the board of directors of Wisk, a joint venture of Kitty Hawk and Boeing. Wisk was ultimately fully acquired by Boeing. At the first e-scooter sharing company, Bird Rides Inc., Estrada helped to establish the business in Los Angeles, throughout the US, and globally.

Estrada was the second attorney at the online video startup YouTube, joining in 2006 before it was acquired by Google, and he worked with Apple to make YouTube the only non-Apple application included on the original launch of the iPhone.
