= Saba Rock =

Small island of the British Virgin Islands in the Caribbean

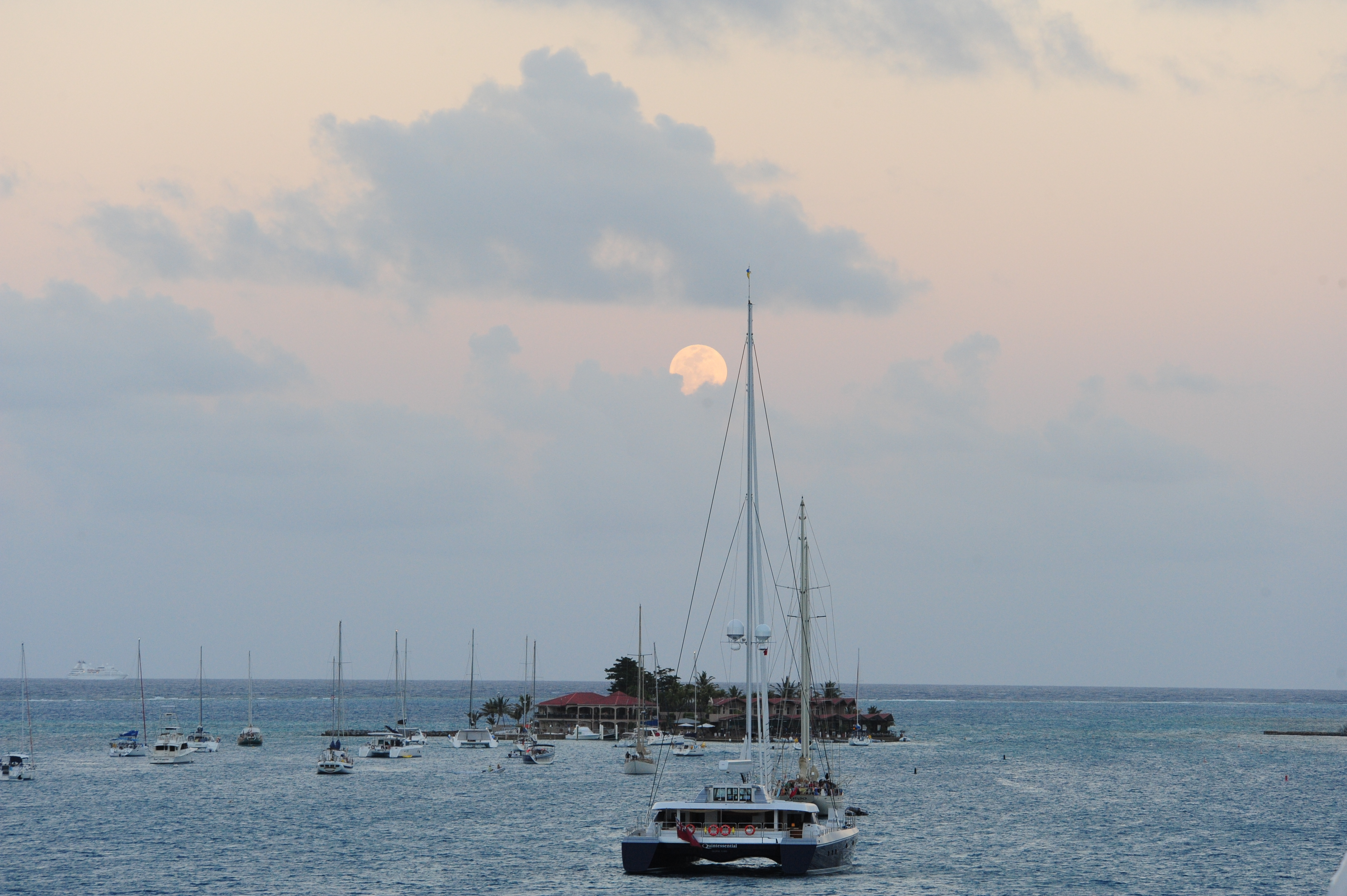
- Full moon rise over Saba Rock, a small island in the British Virgin Islands

- The location of Saba Rock within the British Virgin Islands

- Location within British Virgin Islands Location within the Caribbean

Geography
- Location: Caribbean Sea
- Coordinates: 18°30′11″N 64°21′28″W
- Archipelago: Virgin Islands

Administration
- United Kingdom
- British Overseas Territory: British Virgin Islands

Additional information
- Time zone: AST (UTC-4)
- ISO code: VG

Saba Rock is a small island of the British Virgin Islands in the Caribbean, approximately an acre and a half in size. The island contains a small hotel, restaurant, bar, and gift shop. A dock is available for day visitors and a large mooring field accommodates yachts staying overnight. The resort operates a boat shuttle from Saba Rock to Bitter End Yacht Club and Leverick Bay Marina.

== Geography ==
It sits entirely within the North Sound of Virgin Gorda. Saba Rock is among the cluster of serene, scarcely inhabited Islands that form the North Sound of Virgin Gorda in the British Virgin Islands. The North Sound neighbourhood consists of Richard Branson's exclusive Necker Island and the private Island of Eustatia with the surrounding pristine waters of Eustatia Reef, a snorkeler's paradise.

The island provides habitat for the crested anole (Anolis cristatellus wileyae).

== History ==
It was formerly owned and occupied by Bert Kilbride, a marine archaeologist who for many years served as Her Majesty's Receiver of Wreck in the Territory. It was subsequently sold to the McManus family of Hawaii and now has a small hotel and restaurant on it. Over the years it's developed into a famous stop for the celebrity and yachting crowd. The island is consistently ranked as one of the most popular watering holes in the Caribbean.

In 2017 the island was devastated by hurricane Irma. The reconstruction began in 2018. It is planned to reopen spring 21 by latest owner Petr Kellner.

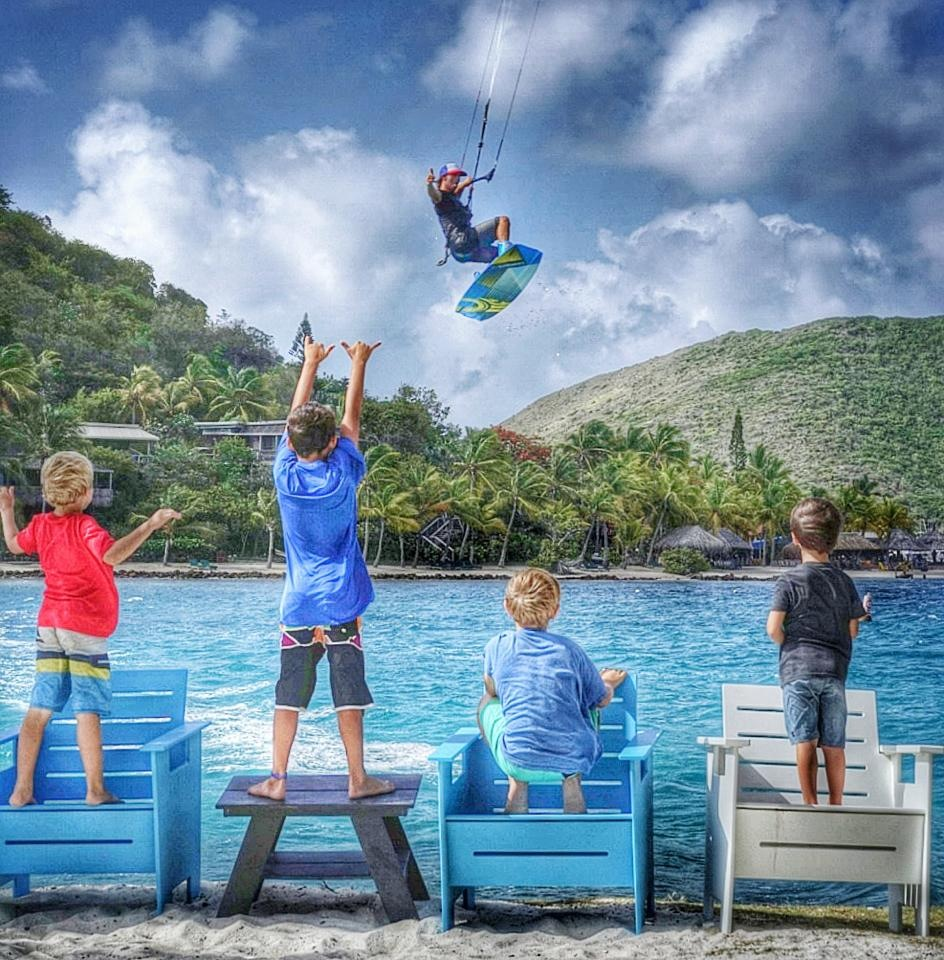
A kiteboarder soars over cheering fans at Saba Rock Resort, British Virgin Islands

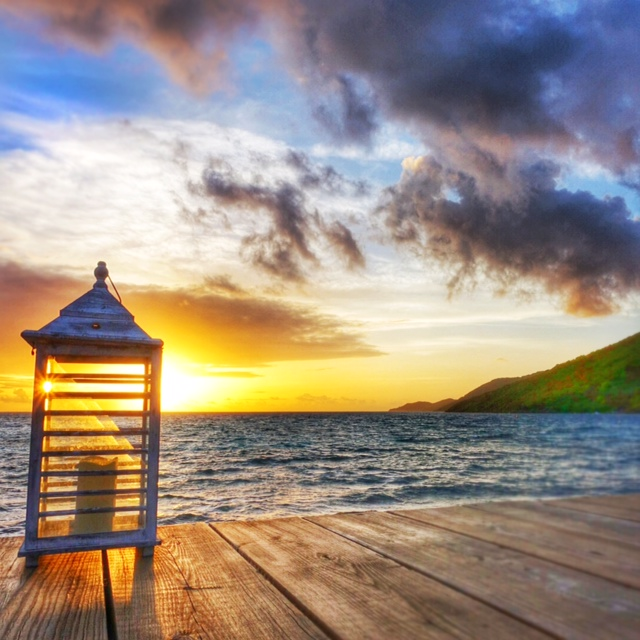
Sunset at Saba Rock Resort, British Virgin Islands

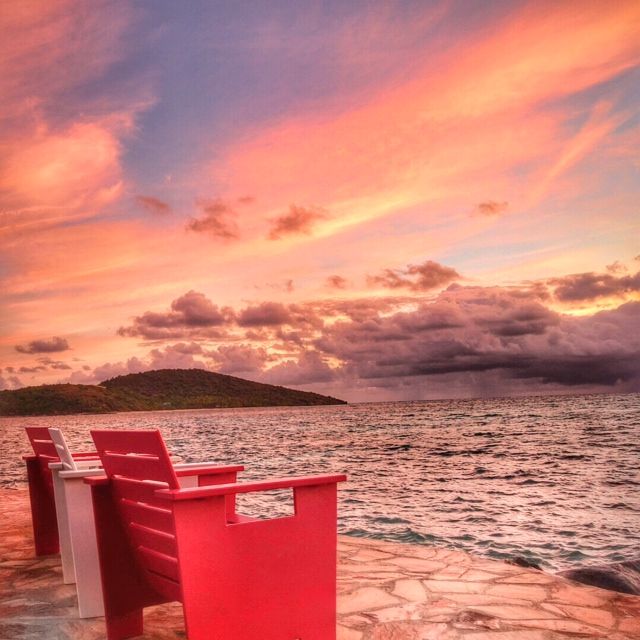
Fiery sky at sunset, Saba Rock, British Virgin Islands

== See also ==
- Effects of Hurricane Irma in the British Virgin Islands
