= Eustatia Island =

Island of the British Virgin Islands

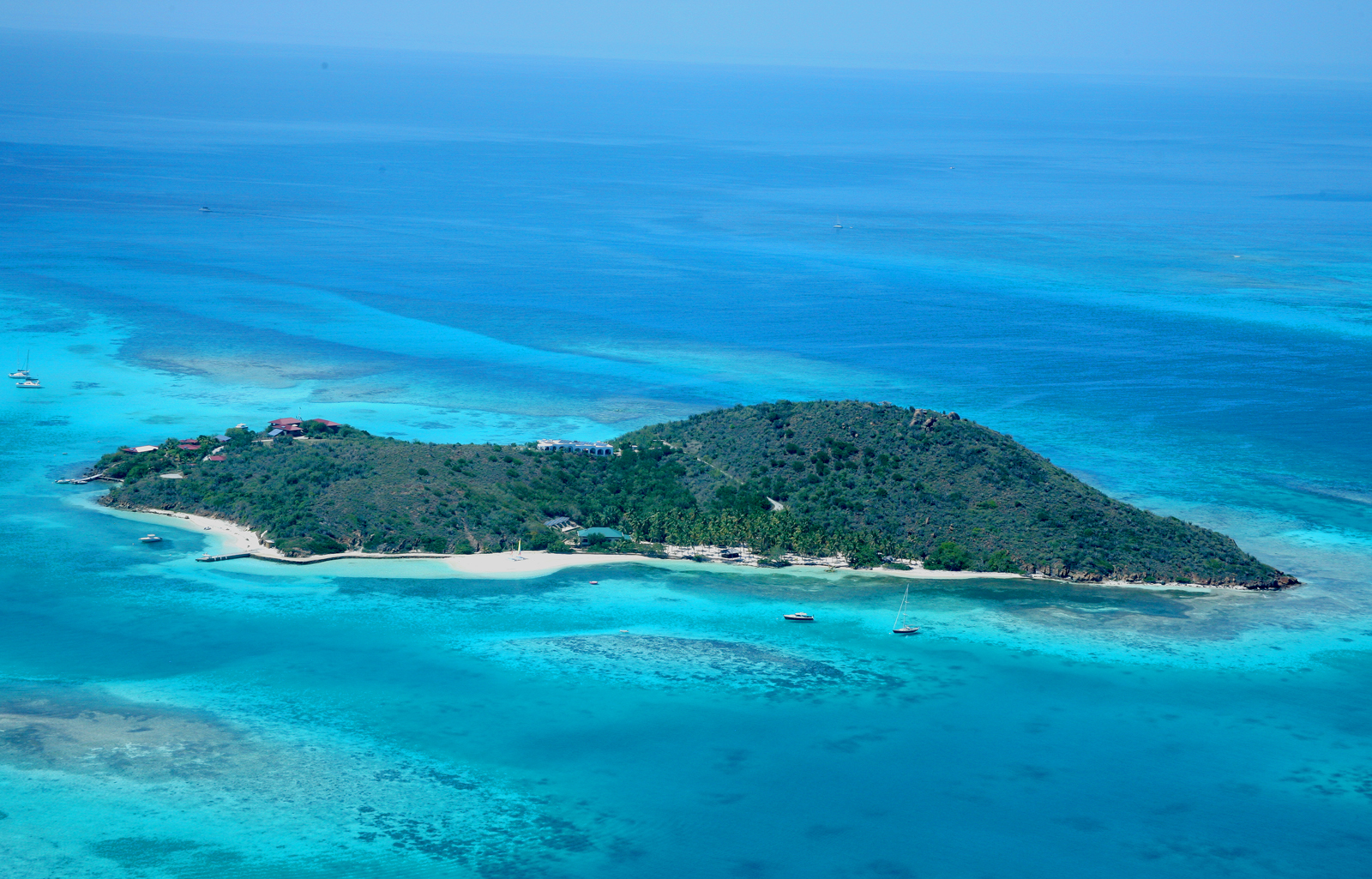
- Eustatia Island

- The location of Eustatia Island within the British Virgin Islands

- Location within British Virgin Islands Location within the Caribbean

Geography
- Location: Caribbean Sea
- Coordinates: 18°31′N 64°22′W
- Archipelago: Virgin Islands

Administration
- United Kingdom
- British Overseas Territory: British Virgin Islands

Additional information
- Time zone: AST (UTC-4)
- ISO code: VG

Eustatia Island is a 30-acre island of the British Virgin Islands (BVI) in the Caribbean. The word "Eustatia" is a Greek derived word meaning, "good place to stay." The entire island, and a small neighboring island, Saba Rock, are under the same long term lease. The island is regularly featured and photographed for several publications and was listed as one of the top 20 most beautiful islands in the world in the December 2004 issue of Islands magazine.

== Location and ownership ==
Eustatia Island is located at latitude 18.51 north and longitude 64.36 west in the eastern section of the British Virgin Islands slightly to the north of Virgin Gorda and Prickly Pear and to the south of Necker Island. The BVI are a group of islands located approximately 1,100 miles southeast of Miami, Florida, 60 miles due east of Puerto Rico and about 120 miles northwest of St. Barts. The island was purchased in 2000 by Mike Hahn, a financier and avid sailor who grew up on Lake Erie. The island is leased by the British Crown to a company registered in the BVI: Eustatia Corporation (company # 1512465) and is entered into the Land Registry as Block 5547A. The head lease granted by the Crown also includes a lease that includes neighboring Saba Rock, a popular restaurant/bar/boutique hotel frequented by sailors, kiteboarders, musicians/actors and creative types. As the underlying shareholders of companies in the BVI are not required to register with the Company Registry, no definitive information is available on who the underlying owner is—though local BVI residents believe the island is owned by Larry Page, who was married on nearby Necker Island.

== Climate ==
Like neighboring islands, Eustatia has fresh trade winds, warm year-round ambient and water temperatures, and more than 300 days of sunshine per year. Trade winds tend to average 10-15 knots from the east northeast. Ambient temperatures range from average day time highs of 85F-90F in the summer to 80F-85F in the winter. Lows average 80F to 75F respectively. Water temperatures are warm year round with the coolest being 77F in the winter to a high 85F in the summer.

While the months of September–November tend to receive the greatest accumulations of rain, there is no official "rainy season". Squalls tend to be intermittent, short lasting, but fairly intense. Relative humidity typically ranges from 60-80%.

Hurricane season is from 1 June through 30 November with the statistical peak in mid September. The last hurricane to hit Eustatia was Hurricane Irma on 11 September 2017. The island was also hit on 30 August 2010, when Hurricane Earl brushed the area as a Category 4 hurricane.

== Geography ==
Eustatia Island is about 30 acres (12 ha) in size, 1,870 feet (0.35 miles) in length, 1,020 feet (0.2 miles) in width and is 210 feet in elevation. The terrain is hilly, but not as rugged as some of the BVI’s other islands with most of Eustatia being accessible by foot. Three white sand beaches are located on the island, with the main beach on the south, a smaller beach on the north side, and another beach on the southwest side of the island.

== Plants, wildlife, sea life ==
A variety of tropical flora and fauna including, jasmine, hibiscus, bougainvillea, tamarind, frangipani, allemande, honey suckle, cacti and succulents are found throughout the island. One of the largest mature coconut palm plantations in the BVI is on the main beach of Eustatia Island. Bird species include sea gulls, pelicans, frigates, boobies, hummingbirds, and doves. Several species of lizards including wood slave, ground, saddleback, and man lizards are also regularly seen throughout the island.

Commonly seen in the surrounding water are a wide variety of reef fish including grunts, parrotfish, trumpet, trigger, snapper, grouper, wrasse, damsel, porcupine and dozens of other species. Green, Loggerhead, and Hawksbill sea turtles are routinely spotted as are southern and spotted stingrays. Conch, lobster, crabs and other invertebrates are abundant.

== Houses ==
Within the owner’s estate there is a three-bedroom hilltop villa with pool and hot tub and sunrise and sunset views, a two-bedroom villa on the beach in a palm grove, and a three-bedroom cottage. The estate has three white sand beaches, hiking trails, a mountain top pavilion and viewing decks, beach pavilion, and lounging pavilion. There are two houses on the southwest tip of the island. The island was developed to keep it in a natural state.

All of the homes on the island draw electrical power from a network of solar panels. Water requirements are fully sustainable. Water is collected through rainfall, filtered and used for drinking and bathing requirements. An organic sewage treatment process recycles gray water into landscaping. Most furnishings were selected from recycled or sustainable wood species. Light fixtures were salvaged from old naval vessels.

== History ==
During the Golden Age of Piracy, the island has been rumored to have been the haunt of pirates. North Sound served as an anchorage for pirates who would have used an "s" route through Eustatia Sound to gain access to the open waters of the Caribbean Sea to escape British ships blocking the entrance and exit to North Sound. This route required superior steering and intimate knowledge of the many shoals and cuts through the reefs in order not to run aground.

== Surrounding area ==
The North Sound area is considered to be the prime resort and yachting location in the BVI where tourists often come to see and experience the protected waters, water sports, and access to a range of islands and resorts. The protected waters and anchorages combined with proximity to luxury resorts and services, as well as neighboring islands, provide privacy and convenience.

The island overlooks Eustatia Sound, a body of water protected by the extensive Eustatia reef and separated from the North Sound area by a narrow gap within which lies Saba Rock. Eustatia Sound is generally off limits to charter boats and provides some of the best water sports activities in the islands. The steady trade winds blowing across the protected waters make Eustatia Sound a windsurfing and kite surfing mecca, while the surrounding reefs provide plenty of opportunities for safe snorkeling and diving.

On Virgin Gorda, the Bitter End Yacht Club offers open air dining in three venues, a 25-slip marina, and one of the best-known water sports centers in the Caribbean. Saba Rock Island Resort features a 10-deepwater-slip marina, rooms and suites, a restaurant and bar, nautical museum and salt water tank with sea life. The 140-acre Biras Creek Resort has 31 suites, a marina, a restaurant and 5-star-rated services. The Leverick Bay Resort and Marina is situated in the western end of North Sound and offers rooms and suites, full-service dock, a 15-slip marina, restaurant, bar and grill, fishing and dive tours, gift shop and nautical gallery. Prickly Pear Island, a designated National Park, features a number of beaches and hiking trails. Necker Island, a world-famous Virgin Limited Edition luxury retreat, and Mosquito Island are both owned by British billionaire Sir Richard Branson.
