= Kitty Hawk Corporation =

American electric aircraft manufacturer

- Formerly: Zee.Aero
- Type: Private
- Industry: Aircraft
- Founded: 2010; 16 years ago
- Founder: Sebastian Thrun
- Defunct: 2022
- Headquarters: Palo Alto, California, U.S.
- Key people: Sebastian Thrun (President and CEO)
- Website: kittyhawk.aero

Kitty Hawk Corporation was an American aircraft manufacturer producing electric ultralight aircraft.

== History ==
The company was founded as Zee.Aero in 2010. It was supported by Google's co-founder Larry Page. In September 2022, it was announced that the company was winding down, though their joint venture with Boeing, Wisk Aero would continue.

== Products ==
=== Kitty Hawk Flyer ===
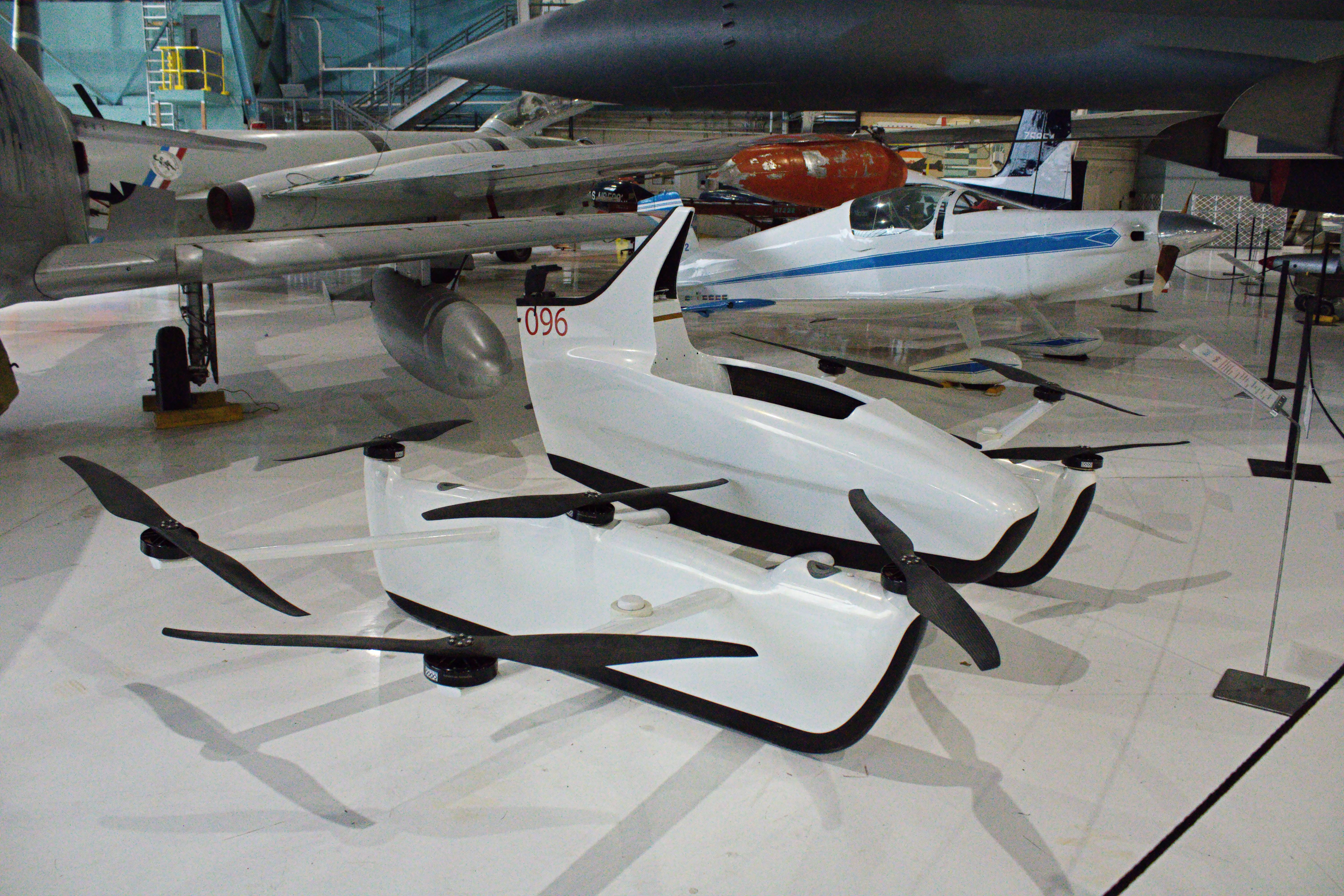
Kitty Hawk Flyer on display at the Wings Over the Rockies Air and Space Museum

The Flyer was an ultralight aircraft which was kept aloft by eight battery-powered propellers. The engineering was led by Cameron Robertson and Todd Reichert. The production Flyer was introduced on 6 June 2018. A license was not required to pilot the Flyer, as it was built under US FAR Part 103 ultralight regulations. After 25,000 unmanned or crewed flights combined, using 111 aircraft, Kitty Hawk ended the programme on 3 June 2020; CEO Sebastian Thrun stated that, with Flyer, the company "could not find a path to a viable business".

=== Cora PAV ===
Since March 2018, Kitty Hawk Corporation had been testing an autonomous, electric air taxi prototype in New Zealand called Cora and code-named Zee.Aero.

In 2019, the Kitty Hawk Cora autonomous personal air vehicle prototype was split off into a joint venture between Wisk Aero LLC and Boeing, becoming the Wisk Cora. In December 2019, the Cora team was rebranded and spun off as a separate company called Wisk Aero.

=== Kitty Hawk Heaviside ===
In 2019, Kitty Hawk introduced a new aircraft called the Heaviside. It is designed to be quieter than normal aircraft.

=== Kitty Hawk H2 (Heaviside 2) ===
In 2022, Kitty Hawk introduced the 2nd iteration of its Heaviside, named H2.
