= Wisk Aero =

California electric aircraft manufacturer

- Type: Subsidiary
- Industry: Aerospace, advanced air mobility
- Founded: 2019; 7 years ago
- Headquarters: Mountain View, California, United States
- Key people: Sebastien Vigneron, CEO
- Products: Wisk autonomous, electric air taxi
- Parent: Archer Aviation
- Website: wisk.aero

Wisk Aero is an aerospace manufacturer based in Mountain View, California, United States. The company develops self-flying electric vertical take off and landing (eVTOL) aircraft designed to be operated as air taxis. The company was formed in 2019 as a partnership between Boeing and Google co-founder Larry Page's Kitty Hawk aircraft company.

== History ==
Wisk Aero's predecessor, Zee Aero, was founded in 2010 with backing from Google's co-founder Larry Page. In 2017, Zee Aero was merged with Kitty Hawk, which made an ultralight aircraft that could take off vertically over open water. In March 2018, Kitty Hawk rebranded its Zee.Aero group as Cora.

On June 25, 2019, Kitty Hawk announced a partnership with Boeing, to combine Cora innovations with Boeing's scale and aerospace expertise. In December, the Cora team was rebranded and spun off as a separate company called Wisk Aero. The company was headquartered in Mountain View, California, and its CEO at the time was Gary Gysin.

In January 2020, then-CEO Gary Gysin announced that their vehicles would be completely self-flying. In February, Wisk became the first partner of the New Zealand Government's Airspace Integration Trials programme, designed to facilitate the safe testing, development and market validation of advanced unmanned aircraft. In November 2020, Wisk Aero joined NASA's Advanced Air Mobility Project, as part of NASA's Aeronautics Research Mission Directorate, in conjunction with the Federal Aviation Administration (FAA), to test how new vehicles interact with other air traffic.

On April 6, 2021, Wisk Aero filed a lawsuit against rival air taxi startup Archer Aviation, alleging theft of trade secrets. In May, Wisk Aero announced a partnership with Blade Urban Air Mobility to operate 30 of Wisk Aero's Cora eVTOLs on Blade's US network of terminals. Wisk Aero's Cora would be added to Blade's private air service digital platform, with Wisk Aero to be compensated based on flight time. In July, Wisk Aero was one of several vendors named to participate in NASA's National Campaign (NC-1) to conduct operational flight demonstrations in urban environments. In August, Archer Aviation countersued Wisk Aero for $1 billion in damages, claiming that Wisk Aero's earlier lawsuit prevented Archer from raising capital.

In January 2022, Wisk Aero announced a $450 million investment by Boeing, to further develop pilot-less flying taxis. At the time of the funding, Boeing announced its goal was to have Wisk's sixth generation passenger vehicle be the first autonomous passenger-carrying vehicle to be certified in the United States, to be presented for certification around 2028. In February, the company began working with the Long Beach Economic Partnership (LBEP) in the city of Long Beach, California to begin planning for the introduction of autonomous flight service in the city. On April 17, the company was one of several companies featured in a 60 Minutes segment on eVTOLs hosted by Anderson Cooper.

In May 2023, the company announced that it had become a wholly owned subsidiary of Boeing, and would continue to operate independently.

Wisk performed a public autonomous flight demonstration for the first time on July 25, 2023, with its fifth-generation Cora at the EAA AirVenture Oshkosh.

In October 2023, Wisk became the first eVTOL air taxi company to conduct public flights in Los Angeles County, at Long Beach Airport.

In February 2024, Wisk partnered with the City of Sugar Land, Texas, and in June 2024, Wisk partnered with the Houston Airport System (HAS) to bring autonomous Advanced Air Mobility (AAM) to the Greater Houston region.

Wisk acquired Verocel in 2024, a software verification and validation (V&V) company.

In July 2024, Wisk and Skyports Infrastructure expanded their partnership to identify an Entry-into-Service (EIS) network for Wisk’s autonomous Generation 6 aircraft in the South East Queensland (SEQ) region of Australia by the 2032 Olympic Games in Brisbane.

In May 2025, Wisk appointed Sebastien Vigneron as CEO. Previously, Sebastien led Product Development of the company’s Generation 6 aircraft, including the Autonomy and Airspace Integration technologies. He succeeds Brian Yutko, who transitioned to become Vice President, Product Development at Boeing’s Commercial Airplanes Division.

In June 2025, Wisk announced that SkyGrid, an AAM Third-Party Service Provider (TSP), will become a subsidiary of Wisk. Also in June, Wisk signed MOUs with the Miami-Dade Aviation Department (MDAD) and University of Miami’s Engineering Autonomy Mobility Initiative (MEAMI), as well as the city of Kaga and Japan Air Lines Engineering Co. (JALEC) to prepare for the introduction of Wisk’s Generation 6 air taxi.

In December 2025, Wisk announced the first test flight of its Gen-6 certification model.

Rival Archer Aviation announced a proposed purchase of Wisk in August 2026.

== Products ==
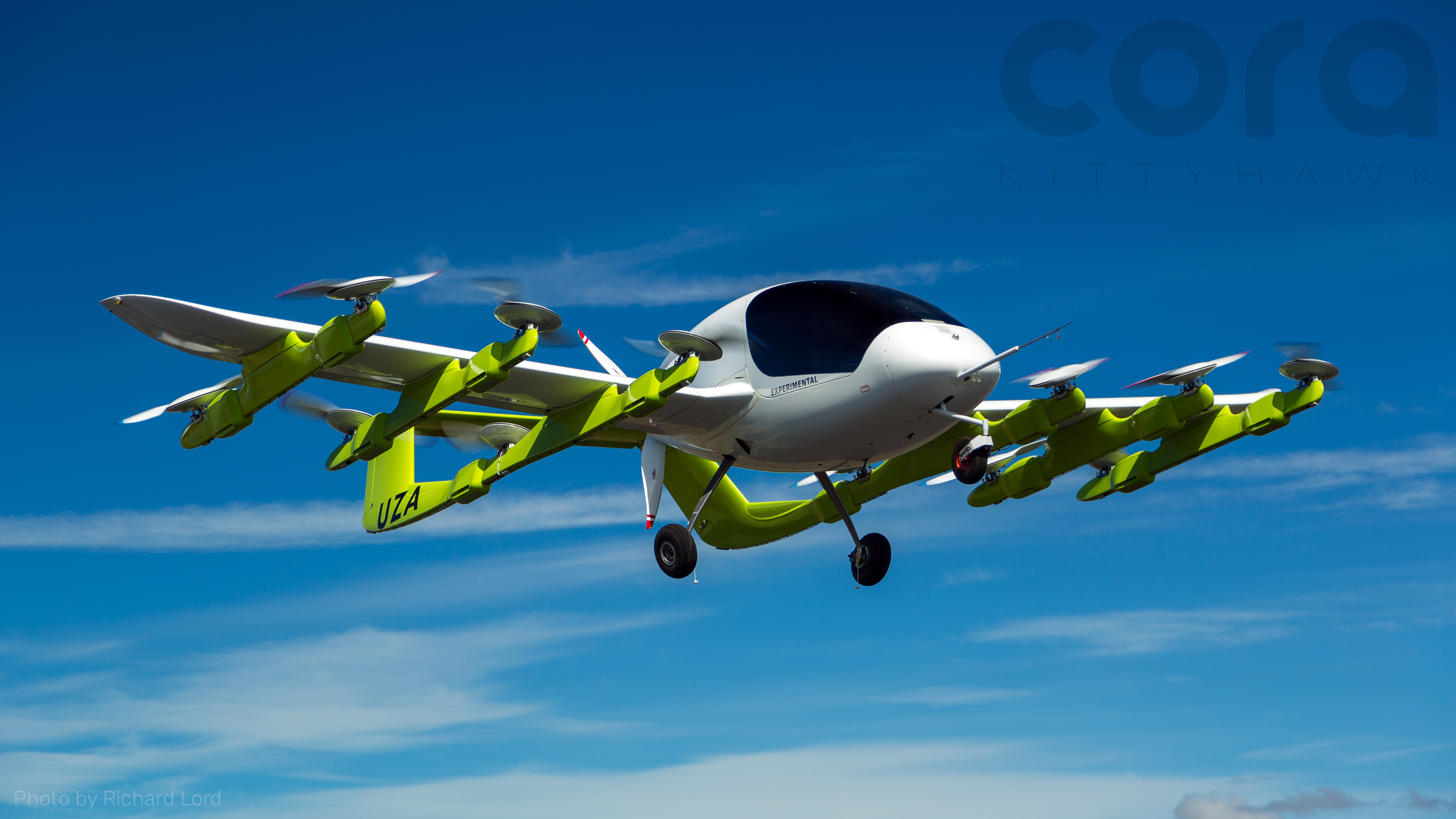
Early prototype of Wisk Cora flying in New Zealand

Wisk Aero develops self-flying eVTOL aircraft. It has designed and built five different generations of its aircraft, which have flown more than 1,750 test flights.

In October 2022, Wisk revealed its sixth generation aircraft, which is the first candidate for type certification of an autonomous eVTOL by the FAA.

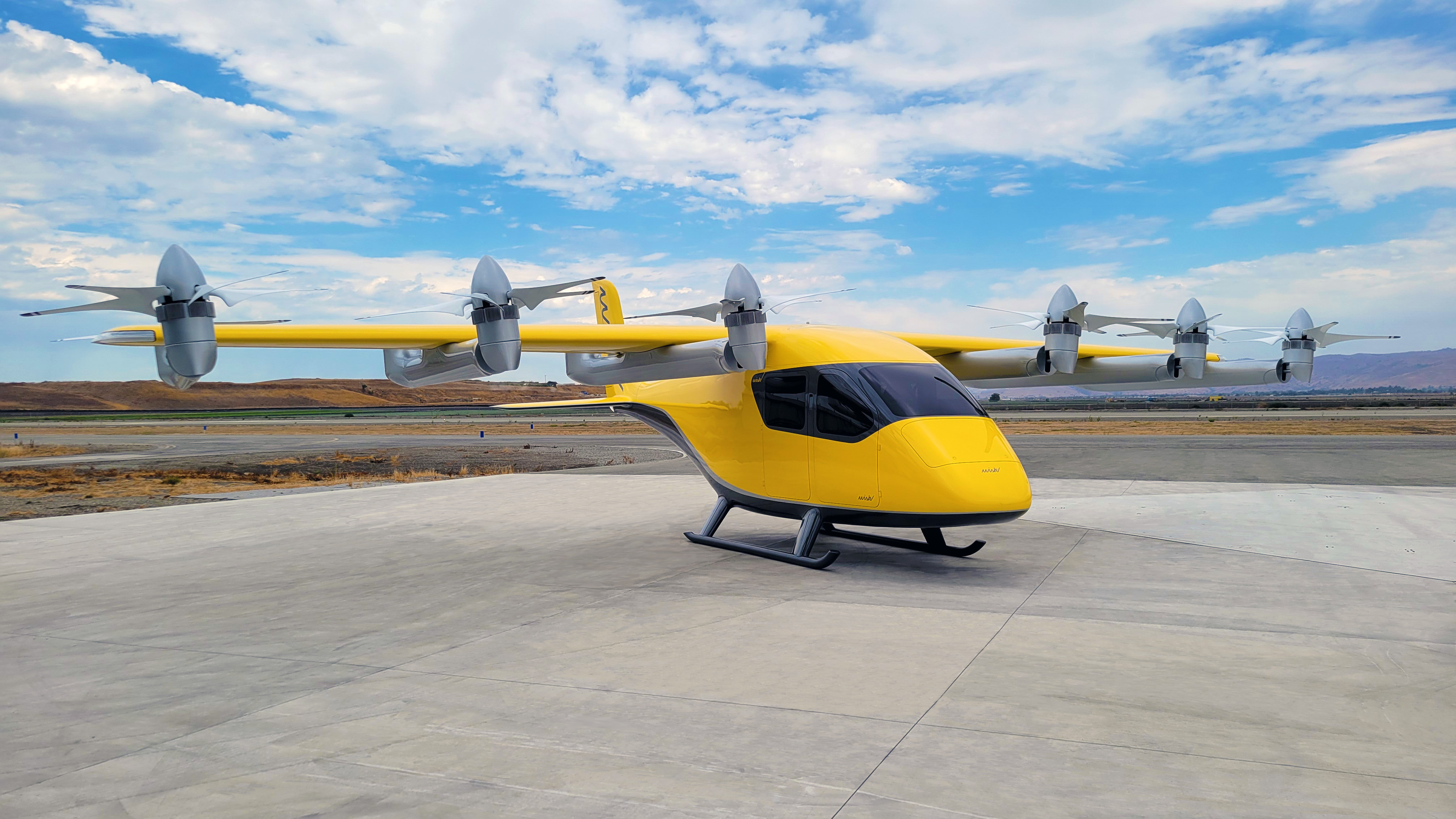
Wisk Gen 6 aircraft

== See also ==
- Electric aircraft
- Urban air mobility
- VTOL
