= Qantas Flight 72 =

2008 aviation accident over the Indian Ocean

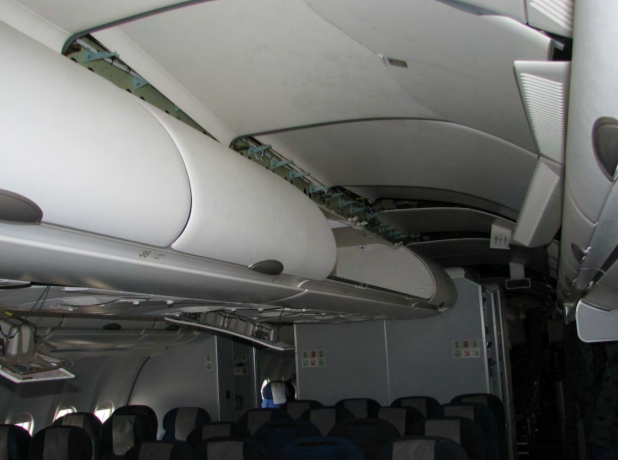
- Damage to the cabin

Accident
- Date: 7 October 2008
- Summary: In-flight upset due to software error resulting in two pitch-downs
- Site: Indian Ocean, 80 nmi (150 km; 92 mi) from Learmonth; 22°14′06″S 114°05′18″E

Aircraft
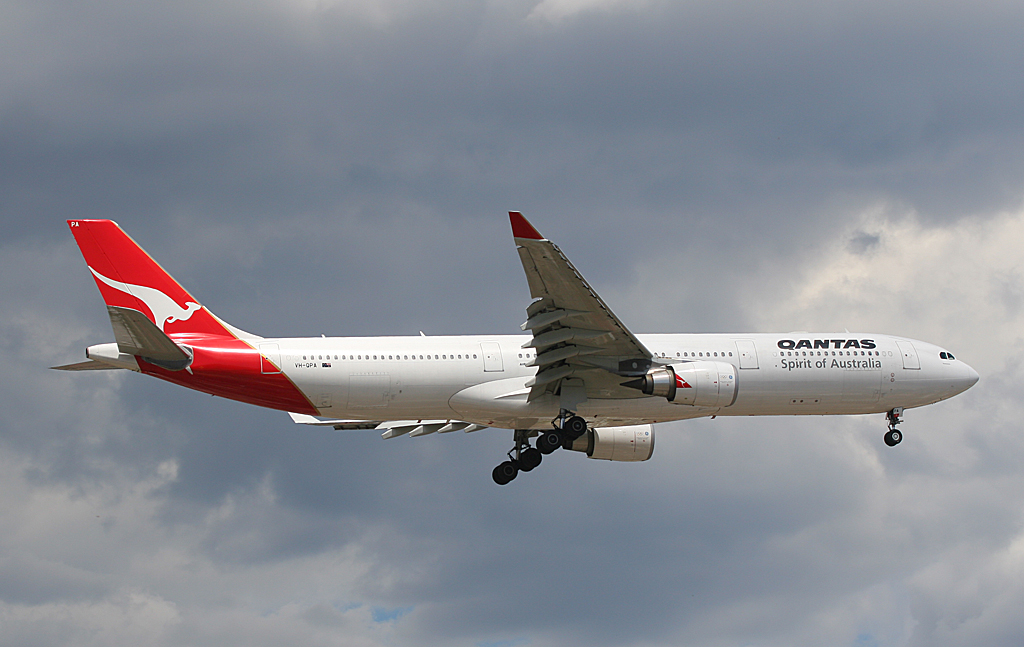
- VH-QPA, the aircraft involved in the accident, pictured in 2007
- Aircraft type: Airbus A330-303
- Aircraft name: Kununurra
- Operator: Qantas
- IATA flight No.: QF72
- ICAO flight No.: QFA72
- Call sign: QANTAS 72
- Registration: VH-QPA
- Flight origin: Changi Airport, Changi, Singapore
- Destination: Perth Airport, Perth, Australia
- Occupants: 315
- Passengers: 303
- Crew: 12
- Fatalities: 0
- Injuries: 119
- Survivors: 315

Qantas Flight 72 (QF72) was a scheduled flight from Singapore Changi Airport to Perth Airport by an Airbus A330. On 7 October 2008, the flight made an emergency landing at Learmonth Airport near the town of Exmouth, Western Australia, following an in-flight upset that included a pair of sudden, uncommanded pitch-down manoeuvres that caused severe injuries—including fractures, lacerations and spinal injuries—to several of the passengers and crew. At Learmonth, the plane was met by the Royal Flying Doctor Service of Australia and CareFlight. Fourteen people were airlifted to Perth for hospitalisation, with thirty-nine others also attending hospital. In all, one crew member and eleven passengers suffered serious injuries, while eight crew and ninety-nine passengers suffered minor injuries. The Australian Transport Safety Bureau (ATSB) investigation found a fault with one of the aircraft's three air data inertial reference units (ADIRUs) and a previously unknown software design limitation of the Airbus A330's fly-by-wire flight control primary computer (FCPC).

== Background ==
The aircraft involved was an Airbus A330-303 twin turbofan aircraft, registered as VH-QPA.

The crew was led by Captain Kevin Sullivan (53), a former US Navy (1977–1986) pilot who had moved to Australia. The first officer was Peter Lipsett, and the second officer was Ross Hales. Captain Sullivan had 13,592 flight hours, including 2,453 hours on the Airbus A330. First Officer Lipsett had 11,650 flight hours, with 1,870 of them on the Airbus A330. Second Officer Hales had 2,070 flight hours, with 480 of them on the Airbus A330.

In addition to the three flight-deck crew members, there were nine cabin crew members and 303 passengers, for a total of 315 people on board.

== Flight details ==
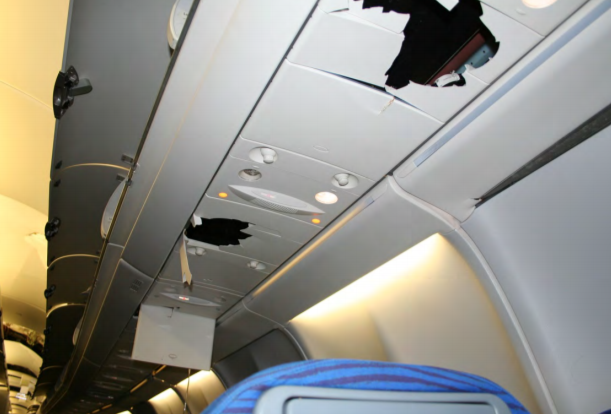
Damage to the cabin from another angle

On 7 October 2008 at 09:32 Singapore Standard Time (SST), Qantas Flight 72, with 315 people on board, departed Changi Airport in Singapore en route to Perth Airport in Australia. By 10:01, the aircraft had reached its cruising altitude of around 37,000 feet (11,000 m) and was maintaining a cruising speed of Mach 0.82.

The incident started at 12:40:26 Australian Western Standard Time (AWST), when one of the aircraft's three air data inertial reference units (ADIRUs) started providing incorrect data to the flight computer. In response to the anomalous data, the autopilot disengaged automatically. A few seconds later, the pilots received electronic messages on the aircraft's electronic centralised aircraft monitor, warning them of an irregularity with the autopilot and inertial reference systems, and contradictory audible stall and overspeed warnings. During this time, the captain began to control the aircraft manually. The autopilot was then re-engaged and the aircraft started to return to the prior selected flight level. The autopilot was disengaged by the crew after about 15 seconds and remained disengaged for the remainder of the flight.

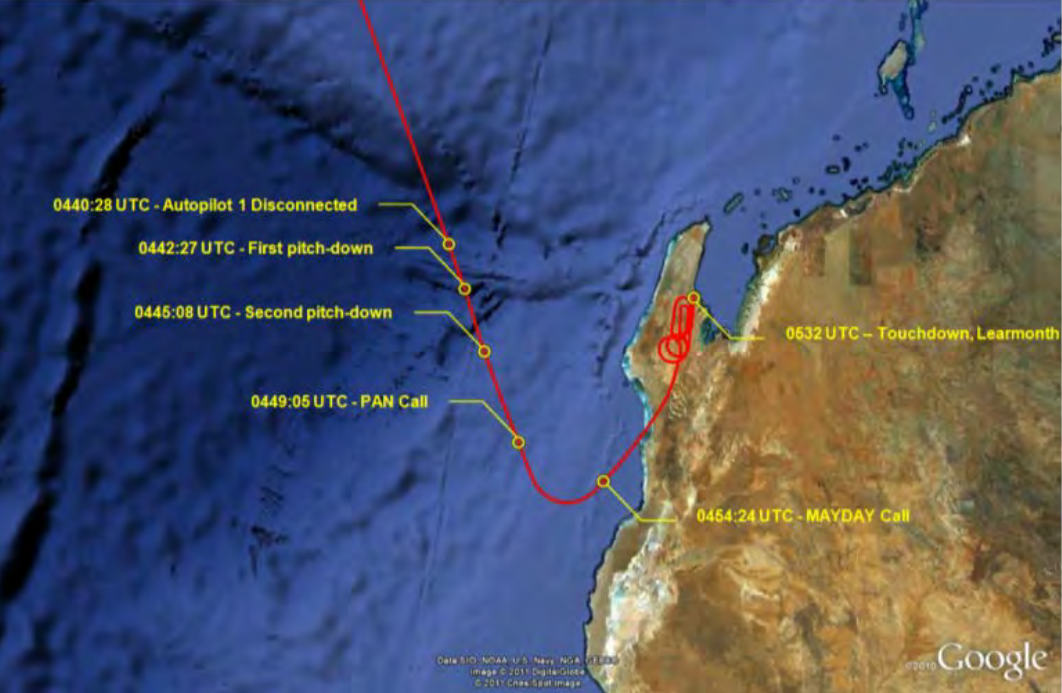
The flight path of Flight 72

At 12:42:27, the aircraft made a sudden, uncommanded pitch-down manoeuvre, experiencing −0.8 g, (Note: "Normal" g-force (i.e. the force on an object due to the gravity of the Earth, if that object is on or near the surface of the Earth, and that object is not subject to other forces) is +1.0 g. As an aircraft is accelerated downward (for example, as in this case, by a sudden, uncommanded pitch-down), the g-force may decrease to 0 (zero), at which point weightlessness is experienced; if the downward acceleration is greater yet, the g-force becomes negative. In the case of Qantas Flight 72, a g-force of nearly one full negative g was experienced; from the in-cabin frame of reference, it can be thought of as if gravity had nearly completely "reversed", and anything not restrained "fell upwards".) reaching 8.4 degrees pitch down and rapidly descending 650 feet (200 m). Twenty seconds later, the pilots were able to return the aircraft to the assigned cruise flight level, FL370. At 12:45:08, the aircraft made a second uncommanded manoeuvre of a similar nature, this time causing an acceleration of +0.2 g, (Note: In this second case, the downward acceleration produced by the uncommanded pitch-down was not enough to create zero or negative g forces, although it would have caused a sensation of near-weightlessness, somewhat similar to the first, highest drop on a roller coaster; +0.2 g would have made everything briefly near-weightless in the cabin, but would not have been enough to float people or objects substantially out of place or throw them around.) a 3.5 degree down angle, and a loss of altitude of 400 feet (120 m); the flight crew was able to re-establish the aircraft's assigned level flight 16 seconds later. Unrestrained (and even some restrained) passengers and crew were flung around the cabin or struck by overhead luggage which broke through the overhead compartment doors. The pilots stabilised the plane and declared a state of alert, which was later updated to mayday when the extent of injuries was relayed to the flight crew.

== Investigation ==
The Australian Transport Safety Bureau (ATSB) investigation was supported by the Australian Civil Aviation Safety Authority, Qantas, the French Bureau of Enquiry and Analysis for Civil Aviation Safety (BEA) and Airbus. Copies of data from the aircraft's flight data recorder and cockpit voice recorder were sent to the BEA and Airbus.

The aircraft was equipped with an air data inertial reference unit (ADIRU) manufactured by Northrop Grumman; investigators sent the unit to Northrop Grumman in the United States for further testing. On 15 January 2009, the European Aviation Safety Agency (EASA) issued an emergency airworthiness directive to address the problem of A330 and A340 aircraft, equipped with the Northrop-Grumman ADIRUs, incorrectly responding to a defective inertial reference.

In a preliminary report, the ATSB identified a fault occurring within the number-one ADIRU as the "likely origin of the event"; the ADIRU, one of three such devices on the aircraft, began to supply incorrect data to the other aircraft systems.

The initial effects of the fault were:

- False (contradictory) stall and overspeed warnings
- Loss of altitude information on the captain's primary flight display
- Several electronic centralised aircraft monitor system warnings

About two minutes later, ADIRU no. 1, which was providing data to the captain's primary flight display, provided very high (and false) indications for the aircraft's angle of attack (AOA), leading to:

- The flight control computers commanding a nose-down aircraft movement, resulting in the aircraft pitching down to a maximum of about 8.5 degrees
- The triggering of a flight-control primary computer (FCPC) pitch fault.

=== FCPC faulty design ===
AOA is a critically important flight parameter, and full-authority flight control systems, such as those equipping A330/A340 aircraft, require accurate AOA data to function properly. The aircraft was fitted with three ADIRUs to provide redundancy for fault tolerance, and the FCPCs used the three independent AOA values to check their consistency. In the usual case, when all three AOA values were valid and consistent, the average value of AOA 1 and AOA 2 was used by the FCPCs for their computations. If either AOA 1 or AOA 2 significantly deviated from the other two values, the FCPCs used a memorised value for 1.2 seconds. The FCPC algorithm was very effective, but it could not correctly manage a scenario where multiple spikes occurred in either AOA 1 or AOA 2 that were 1.2 seconds apart—that is, if the 1.2-second period of use of the memorised value happened to end while another spike was happening.

As with other safety-critical systems, the development of the A330/A340 flight-control system during 1991 and 1992 had many elements to minimise the risk of a design error, including peer reviews, a system safety assessment (SSA), and testing and simulations to verify and validate the system requirements. None of these activities identified the design limitation in the FCPC's AOA algorithm.

The ADIRU failure mode had not been previously encountered, or identified by the ADIRU manufacturer in its SSA activities. Overall, the design, verification and validation processes used by the aircraft manufacturer did not fully consider the potential effects of frequent spikes in data from an ADIRU.

Airbus stated that it was not aware of a similar incident occurring previously on an Airbus aircraft. It released an operators' information Telex to operators of A330 and A340 aircraft with procedural recommendations and checklists to minimise risk in the event of a similar incident.

== Final report ==
=== Analysis ===
After detailed forensic analysis of the FDR, the FCPC software, and the ADIRU, the CPU of the ADIRU was found to have corrupted the AOA data. The exact nature of the corruption was that the ADIRU CPU erroneously relabelled the altitude data word so that the binary data that represented 37,012 (the altitude at the time of the incident) would represent an angle of attack of 50.625°. The FCPC then processed the erroneously high AOA data, triggering the high-AOA protection mode, which sent a command to the electrical flight control system to pitch the nose down.

=== Potential trigger types ===
A number of potential trigger types were investigated, including software bugs, software corruption, hardware faults, electromagnetic interference, and the secondary high-energy particles generated by cosmic rays that can cause a bit flip. Although a definitive conclusion could not be reached, sufficient information from multiple sources enabled the conclusion that most of the potential triggers were very unlikely to have been involved. A much more likely scenario was that a marginal hardware weakness of some form made the units susceptible to the effects of some type of environmental factor, which triggered the failure mode.

Although speculation arose that interference from Naval Communication Station Harold E. Holt or passenger personal electronic devices could have been involved in the incident, the ATSB assessed this possibility as "extremely unlikely".

=== Conclusion ===
The ATSB's final report, issued on 19 December 2011, concluded that the incident "occurred due to the combination of a design limitation in the FCPC software of the Airbus A330/A340, and a failure mode affecting one of the aircraft’s three ADIRUs. The design limitation meant that in a very rare and specific situation, multiple spikes in AOA data from one of the ADIRUs could result in the FCPCs commanding the aircraft to pitch down."

=== Subsequent Qantas Flight 71 incident ===
On 27 December 2008, a Qantas A330-300 aircraft operating from Perth to Singapore was involved in an occurrence about 260 nautical miles (480 km) north-west of Perth and 350 nautical miles (650 km) south of Learmonth Airport at 1729 WST, while flying at FL360. The autopilot disconnected and the crew received an alert indicating a problem with ADIRU no. 1. The crew performed the revised procedure released by Airbus after the earlier accident and returned to Perth uneventfully. The ATSB included the incident in their existing accident investigation of Flight 72. The incident again fuelled media speculation regarding the significance of the aforementioned Harold E. Holt facility, with the Australian and International Pilots Association calling for commercial aircraft to be barred from the area as a precaution until the events could be better understood, while the manager of the facility claimed that it was "highly, highly unlikely" that any interference had been caused.

== Aftermath ==
The town and state emergency and health services responded. The Royal Flying Doctor Service and a CareFlight jet ambulance evacuated the 20 more seriously injured people to Perth. Others were treated at nearby Exmouth Hospital. Qantas sent two planes, with medical teams and customs officers, from Perth to Exmouth to help treat the injured people and fly those not hurt back to Perth. People who did not want to fly that night were provided with accommodations in Exmouth.

VH-QPA sustained minor damage; it was repaired and returned to service with Qantas.

=== Compensation ===
In the aftermath of the accident, Qantas offered compensation to all passengers. The airline announced it would refund the cost of all travel on their itineraries covering the accident flight, offer a voucher equivalent to a return trip to London applicable to their class of travel and pay for medical expenses arising from the accident. Further compensation claims would be considered on a case-by-case basis, with several passengers from the flight pursuing legal action against Qantas. One couple asserted that they were wearing their seatbelts at the time of the incident and questioned Qantas' handling of their cases. Permanently injured flight attendant Fuzzy Maiava was advised not to take an NZ$35,000 compensation payment from Qantas so that he could take part in a class-action lawsuit against Airbus and Northrop Grumman. The case was dismissed on procedural grounds, though, leaving Maiava without compensation. He remained unable to work or drive a vehicle.

== Dramatisation and book ==
In 2018, the events of Qantas 72 were featured in "Free Fall" (season 18, episode 7) in the Canadian TV series Mayday. In May 2019, a book on the incident by Kevin Sullivan (captain of the flight) was published in Australia. In June 2019, Seven Network's Sunday Night featured the events of Qantas 72 through recollections of several passengers and crew who were on board the flight, including Sullivan and flight attendant Fuzzy Maiava, as well as comments from US Airways Flight 1549 captain Chesley "Sully" Sullenberger, but Qantas has banned any of its current employees from being interviewed about the incident, including Diana Casey, an off-duty customer-service manager who helped numerous others on board, despite being injured herself.

== See also ==
- Air data inertial reference unit
- LATAM Airlines Flight 800
- China Airlines Flight 006
- China Eastern Airlines Flight 583
- List of accidents and incidents involving commercial aircraft
