= Flight control modes =

Aircraft control computer software

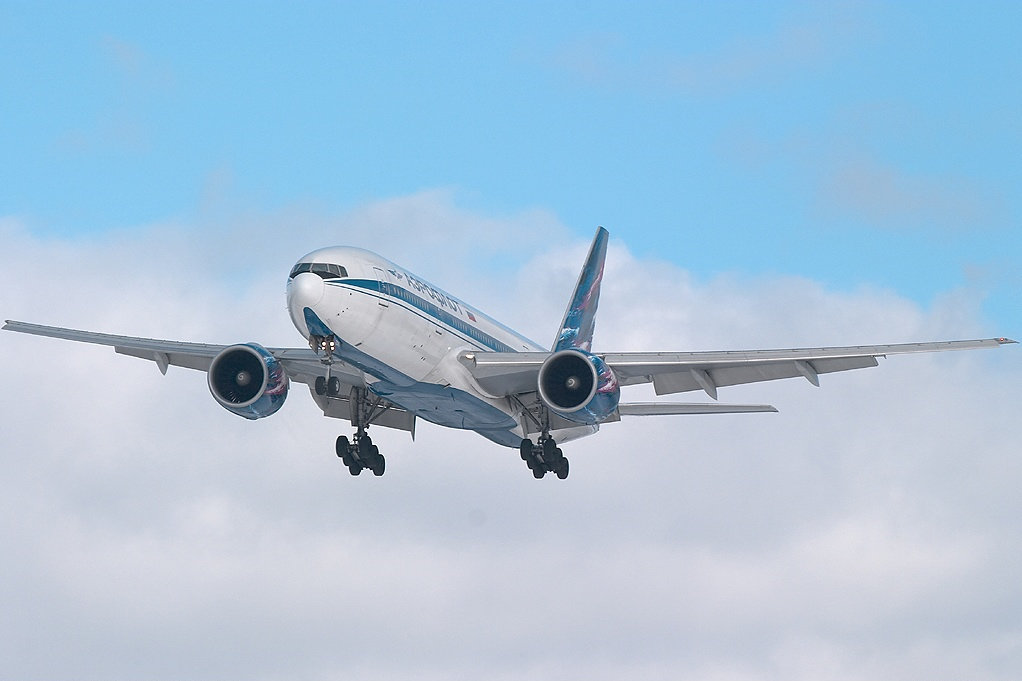
Modern aircraft designs like the Boeing 777 rely on sophisticated flight computers to aid and protect the aircraft in flight. These are governed by computational laws which assign flight control modes during flight.

A flight control mode or flight control law is a computer software algorithm that transforms the movement of the yoke or joystick, made by an aircraft pilot, into movements of the aircraft control surfaces. The control surface movements depend on which of several modes the flight computer is in. In aircraft in which the flight control system is fly-by-wire, the movements the pilot makes to the yoke or joystick in the cockpit, to control the flight, are converted to electronic signals, which are transmitted to the flight control computers that determine how to move each control surface to provide the aircraft movement the pilot ordered.

A reduction of electronic flight control can be caused by the failure of a computational device, such as the flight control computer or an information providing device, such as the Air Data Inertial Reference Unit (ADIRU).

Electronic flight control systems (EFCS) also provide augmentation in normal flight, such as increased protection of the aircraft from overstress or providing a more comfortable flight for passengers by recognizing and correcting for turbulence and providing yaw damping.

Two aircraft manufacturers produce commercial passenger aircraft with primary flight computers that can perform under different flight control modes. The most well-known is the system of normal, alternate, direct laws and mechanical alternate control laws of the Airbus A320-A380. The other is Boeing's fly-by-wire system, used in the Boeing 777, Boeing 787 Dreamliner and Boeing 747-8.

These newer aircraft use electronic control systems to increase safety and performance while saving aircraft weight. These electronic systems are lighter than the old mechanical systems and can also protect the aircraft from overstress situations, allowing designers to reduce over-engineered components, which further reduces the aircraft's weight.

== Flight control laws (Airbus) ==
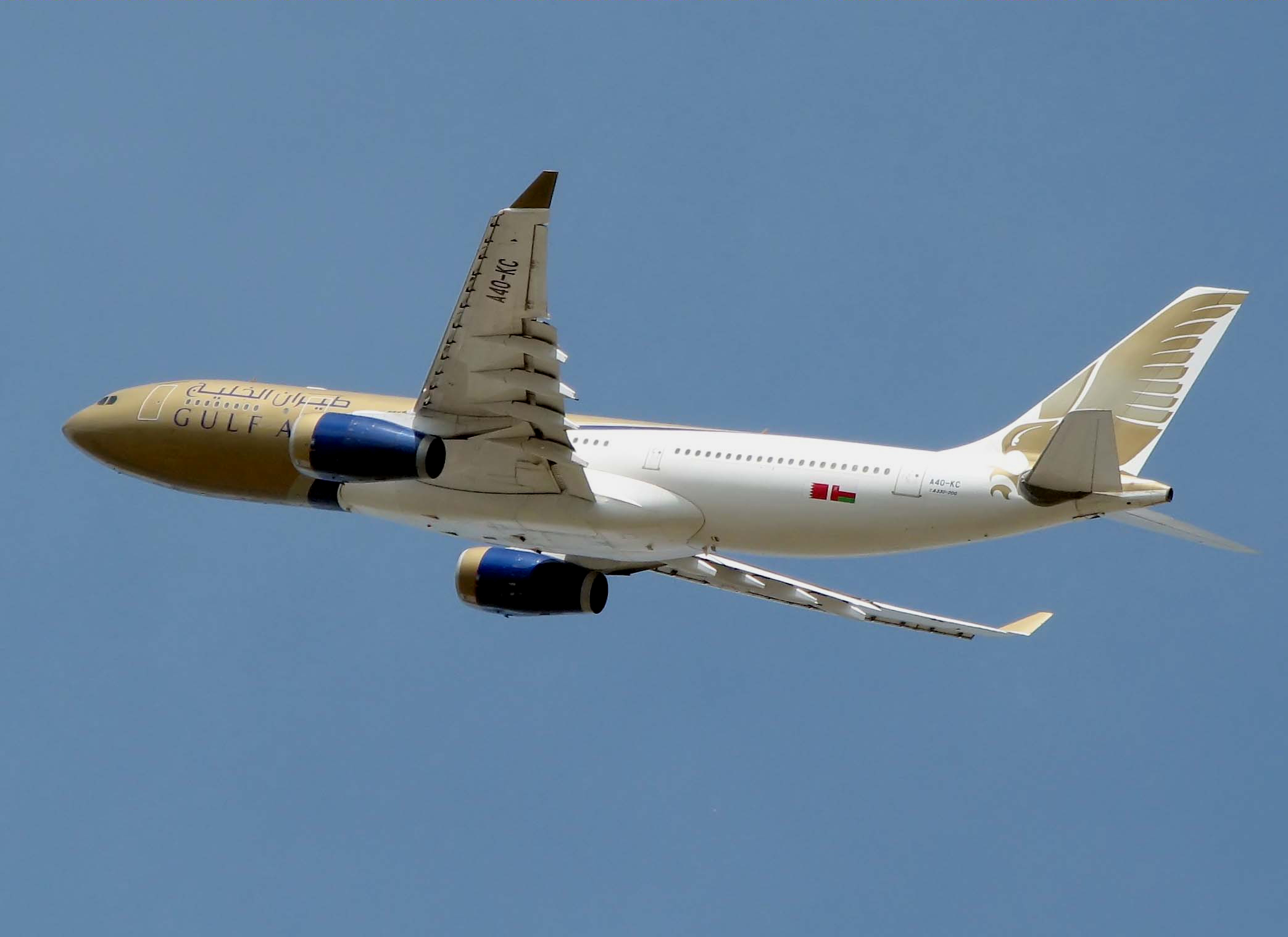
A330-200 in flight

Airbus aircraft designs after the A300/A310 are almost completely controlled by fly-by-wire equipment. These newer aircraft, including the A320, A330, A340, A350 and A380 operate under Airbus flight control laws. The flight controls on the Airbus A330, for example, are all electronically controlled and hydraulically activated. Some surfaces, such as the rudder, can also be mechanically controlled. In normal flight, the computers act to prevent excessive forces in pitch and roll.

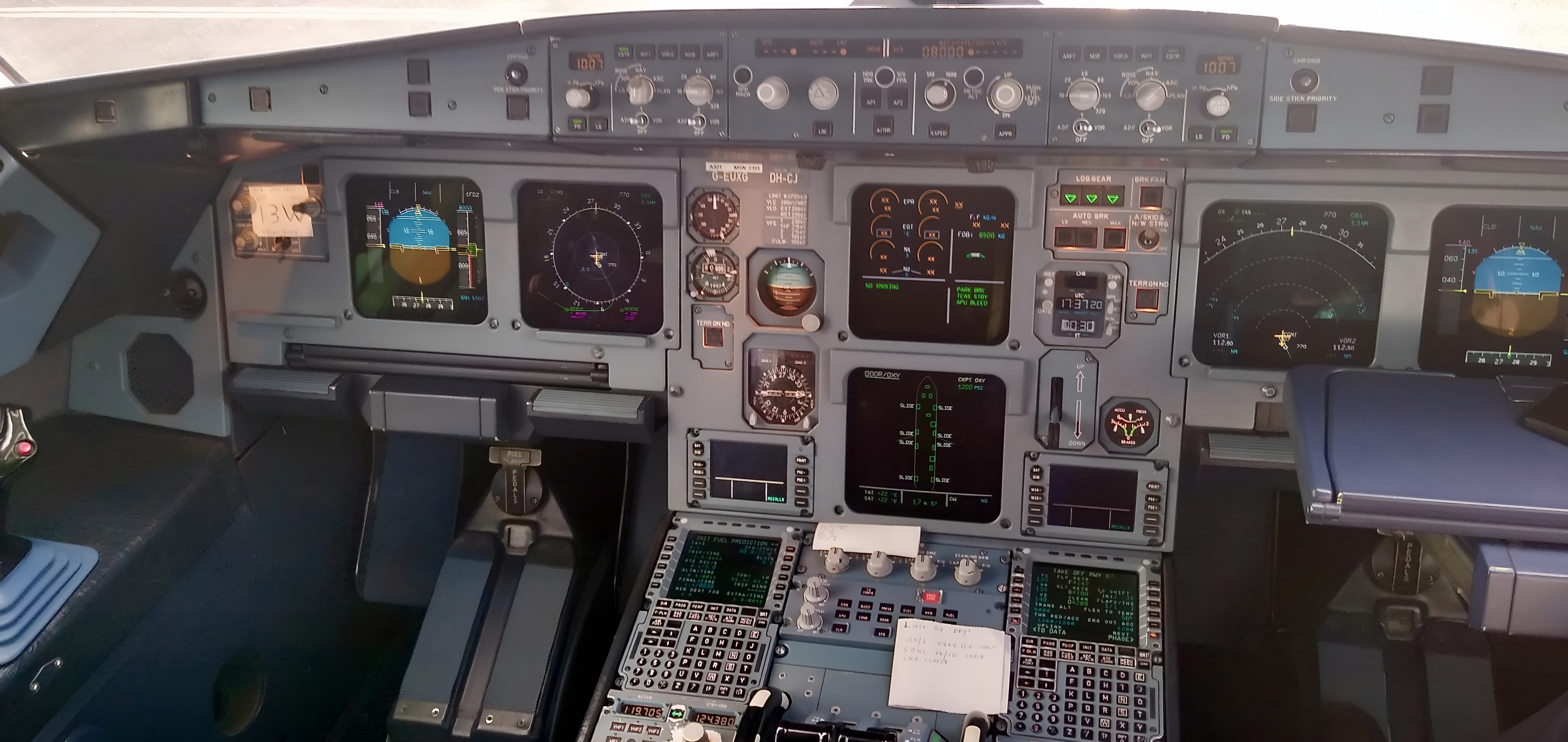
Airbus A321 cockpit

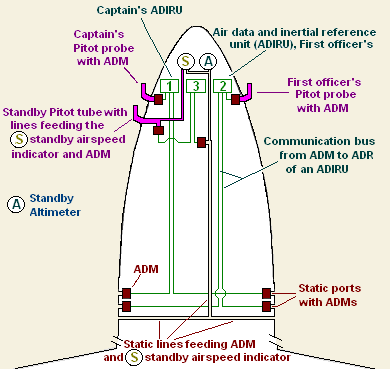
Illustration of the air-data reference system on Airbus A330

The aircraft is controlled by three primary control computers (captain's, first officer's, and standby) and two secondary control computers (captain's and first officer's). In addition there are two flight control data computers (FCDC) that read information from the sensors, such as air data (airspeed, altitude). This is fed along with GPS data, into three redundant processing units known as air data inertial reference units (ADIRUs) that act both as an air data reference and inertial reference. ADIRUs are part of the air data inertial reference system, which, on the Airbus is linked to eight air data modules: three are linked to pitot tubes and five are linked to static sources. Information from the ADIRU is fed into one of several flight control computers (primary and secondary flight control). The computers also receive information from the control surfaces of the aircraft and from the pilot's aircraft control devices and autopilot. Information from these computers is sent both to the pilot's primary flight display and also to the control surfaces.

There are four named flight control laws; however, alternate law consists of two modes, alternate law 1 and alternate law 2. Each of these modes have different sub modes: ground mode, flight mode and flare, plus a back-up mechanical control.

=== Normal law ===
Normal law differs depending on the stage of flight. These include:

- Stationary at the gate
- Taxiing from the gate to a runway or from a runway back to the gate
- Beginning the take-off roll
- Initial climb
- Cruise climb and cruise flight at altitude
- Final descent, flare and landing.

In normal law, during the transition from take-off to cruise there is a 5-second transition, from descent to flare there is a 2-second transition, and from flare to ground there is another 2-second transition.

==== Ground mode ====
The aircraft behaves as in direct mode: the auto-trim feature is turned off and there is a direct response of the elevators to the sidestick inputs. The horizontal stabilizer is set to 4° up but manual settings (e.g., for center of gravity) override this setting. After the wheels leave the ground, a 5-second transition occurs where normal law – flight mode takes over from ground mode.

==== Flight mode ====
The flight mode of normal law provides five types of protection: pitch attitude, load factor limitations, high speed, high-AOA and bank angle. Flight mode is operational from take-off until shortly before the aircraft lands, around 100 feet above ground level. It can be lost prematurely as a result of pilot commands or system failures. Loss of normal law as a result of a system failure results in alternate law 1 or 2.

Unlike conventional controls, in normal law vertical side stick movement corresponds to a load factor proportional to stick deflection independent of aircraft speed. When the stick is neutral and the load factor is 1g, the aircraft remains in level flight without the pilot changing the elevator trim. Horizontal side stick movement commands a roll rate, and the aircraft maintains a proper pitch angle once a turn has been established, up to 33° bank. The system prevents further trim up when the angle of attack is excessive, the load factor exceeds 1.3g, or when the bank angle exceeds 33°.

Alpha protection (α-Prot) prevents stalling and guards against the effects of windshear. The protection engages when the angle of attack is between α-Prot and α-Max and limits the angle of attack commanded by the pilot's sidestick or, if autopilot is engaged, it disengages the autopilot.

Alpha Floor (α-Floor) is a low speed protection feature of the autothrottle that prevents the aircraft from stalling due to a low energy state during high angles of attack. If the aircraft approaches or reaches its maximum allowed angle of attack, the autothrottle system will command the engines to TO/GA thrust, irrespective of the thrust lever's position or whether the autothrottle is engaged or not. Once the aircraft's angle of attack returns to a safe range, the autothrottle system will switch to TOGA Lock mode, which maintains TOGA thrust until the pilots move the thrust lever to a suitable position then disengages the autothrottle.

High speed protection will automatically recover from an overspeed. There are two speed limitations for high-altitude aircraft, V_{MO} (maximum operational velocity) and M_{MO} (maximum operational Mach) the two speeds are the same at approximately 31,000 feet, below which overspeed is determined by V_{MO} and above which by M_{MO}.

==== Flare mode ====
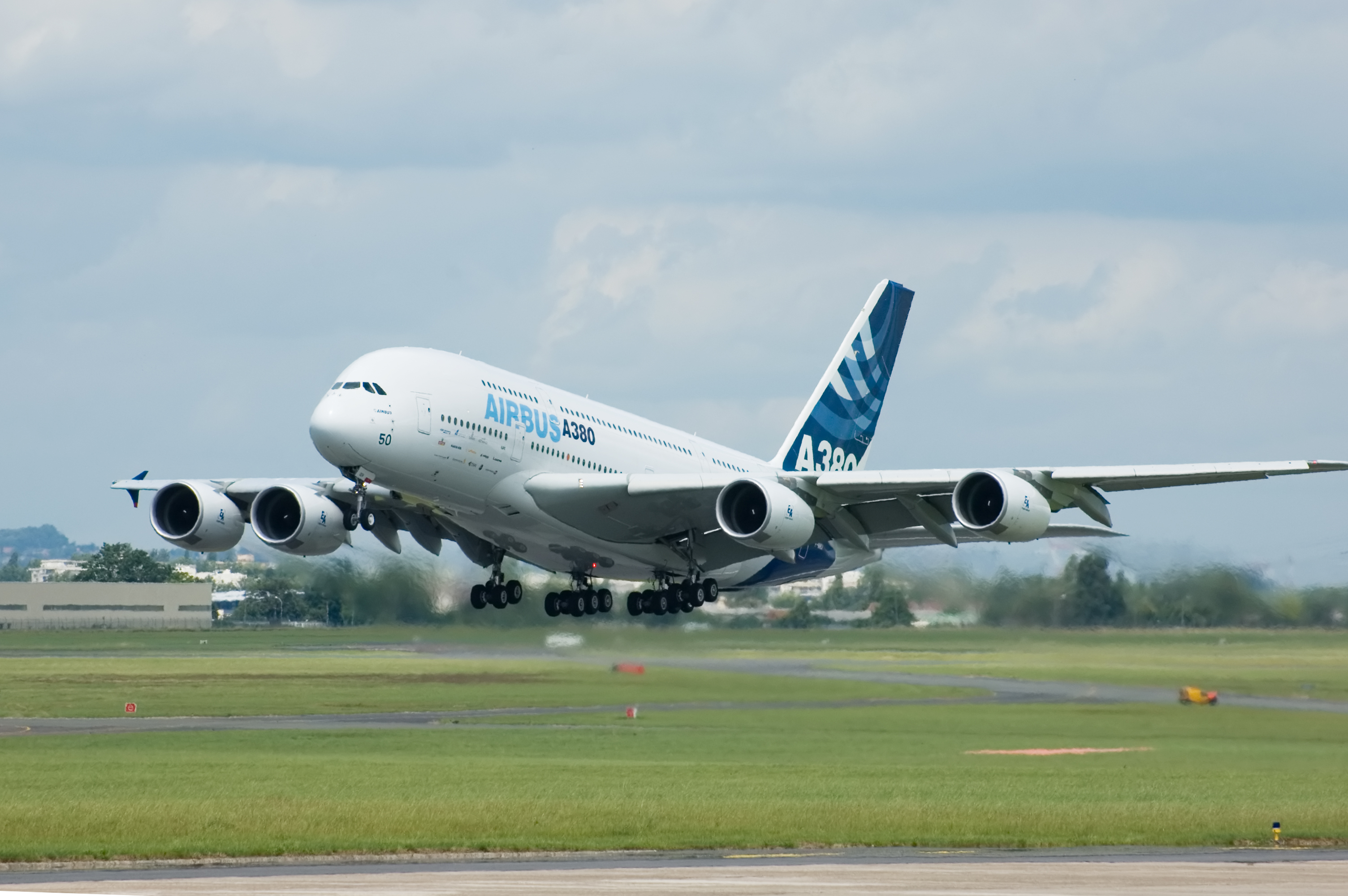
A380 in take off

This mode is automatically engaged when the radar altimeter indicates 100 feet above ground. At 50 feet the aircraft trims the nose slightly down. During the landing flare, normal law provides high-angle of attack protection and bank angle protection. The load factor is permitted to be from 2.5g to −1g, or 2.0g to 0g when slats are extended. Pitch attitude is limited from −15° to +30°, and upper limit is further reduced to +25° as the aircraft slows.

=== Alternate law ===
There are four reconfiguration modes for the Airbus fly-by-wire aircraft: alternate law 1, alternate law 2, direct law and mechanical law. The ground mode and flare modes for alternate law are identical to those modes for normal law.

Alternate law 1 (ALT1) mode combines a normal law lateral mode with the load factor, bank angle protections retained. High angle of attack protection may be lost and low energy (level flight stall) protection is lost. High speed and high angle of attack protections enter alternate law mode.

ALT1 may be entered if there are faults in the horizontal stabilizer, an elevator, yaw-damper actuation, slat or flap sensor, or a single air data reference fault.

Alternate law 2 (ALT2) loses normal law lateral mode (replaced by roll direct mode and yaw alternate mode) along with pitch attitude protection, bank angle protection and low energy protection. Load factor protection is retained. High angle of attack and high speed protections are retained unless the reason for alternate law 2 mode is the failure of two air-data references or if the two remaining air data references disagree.

ALT2 mode is entered when two engines flame out (on dual engine aircraft), faults in two inertial or air-data references, with the autopilot being lost, except with an ADR disagreement. This mode may also be entered with an all spoilers fault, certain ailerons fault, or pedal transducers fault.

=== Direct law ===
Direct law (DIR) introduces a direct stick-to-control surfaces relationship: control surface motion is directly related to the sidestick and rudder pedal motion. The trimmable horizontal stabilizer can only be controlled by the manual trim wheel. All protections are lost, and the maximum deflection of the elevators is limited for each configuration as a function of the current aircraft centre of gravity. This aims to create a compromise between adequate pitch control with a forward center of gravity and not-too-sensitive control with an aft center of gravity.

DIR is entered if there is failure of three inertial reference units or the primary flight computers, faults in two elevators, or flame-out in two engines (on a two-engine aircraft) when the captain's primary flight computer is also inoperable.

=== Mechanical control ===
In the mechanical control back-up mode, pitch is controlled by the mechanical trim system and lateral direction is controlled by the rudder pedals operating the rudder mechanically.

== Boeing 777 primary flight control system ==
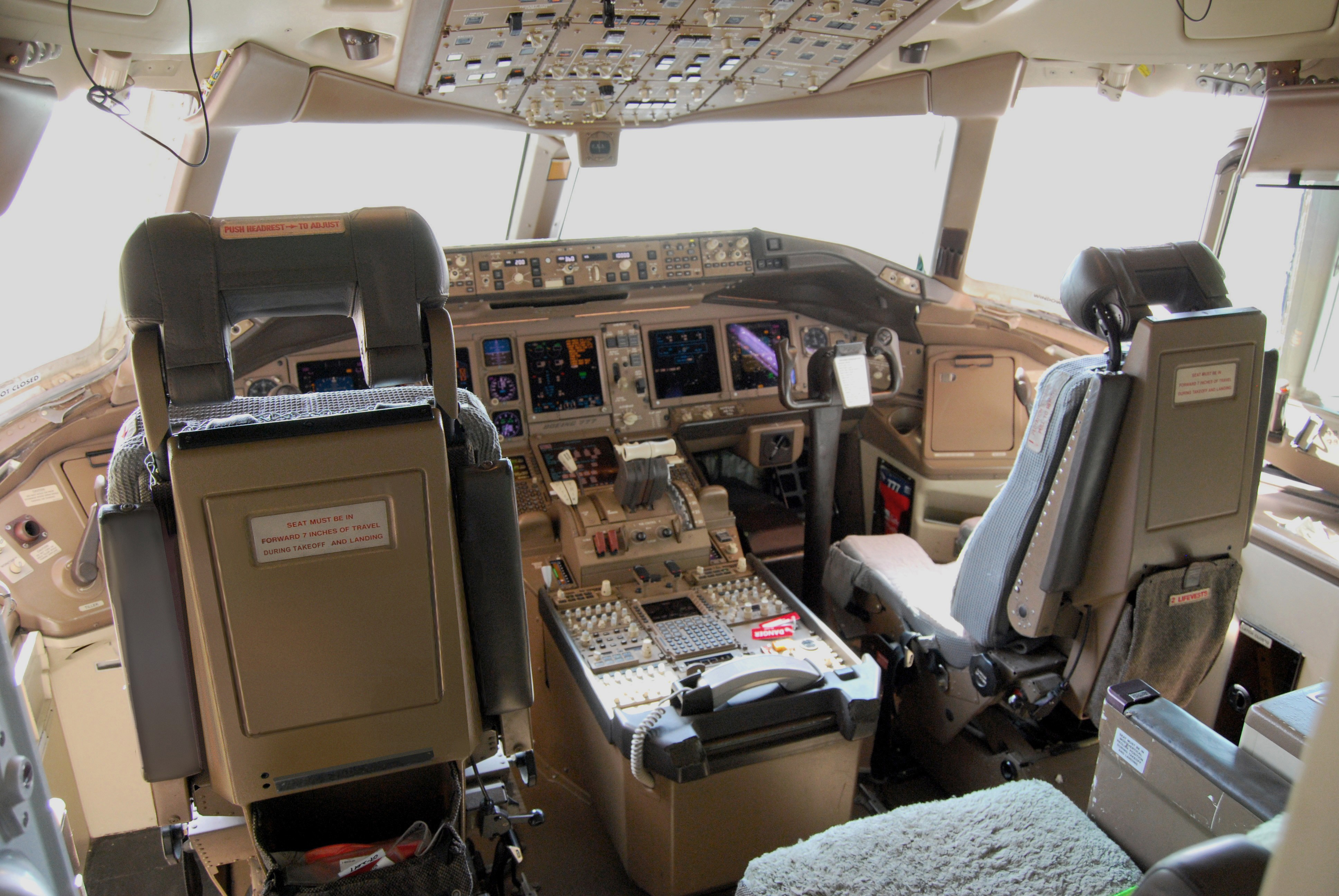
The cockpit of the 777 is similar to 747-400, a fly-by-wire control simulating mechanical control.

The fly-by-wire electronic flight control system of the Boeing 777 differs from the Airbus EFCS. The design principle is to provide a system that responds similarly to a mechanically controlled system. Because the system is controlled electronically, the flight control system can provide flight envelope protection.

The electronic system is subdivided between two levels, the four actuator control electronics (ACE) and the three primary flight computers (PFC). The ACEs control actuators (from those on pilot controls to control surface controls and the PFC). The role of the PFC is to calculate the control laws and provide feedback forces, pilot information and warnings.

=== Standard protections and augmentations ===
The flight control system on the 777 is designed to restrict control authority beyond certain range by increasing the back pressure once the desired limit is reached. This is done via electronically controlled backdrive actuators (controlled by ACE). The protections and augmentations are: bank angle protection, turn compensation, stall protection, over-speed protection, pitch control, stability augmentation and thrust asymmetry compensation. The design philosophy is to inform the pilot that the command being given would put the aircraft outside of its normal operating envelope, but the ability to do so is not precluded.

=== Normal mode ===
In normal mode the PFCs transmit actuator commands to the ACEs, which convert them into analog servo commands. Full functionality is provided, including all enhanced performance, envelope protection and ride quality features.

=== Secondary mode ===
Boeing secondary mode is comparable to the Airbus alternate law, with the PFCs supplying commands to the ACEs. However, EFCS functionality is reduced, including loss of flight envelope protection. Like the Airbus system, this state is entered when a number of failures occur in the EFCS or interfacing systems (e.g., ADIRU or SAARU). Moreover, in case of a complete failure of all PFCs and ACEs, the ailerons and selected roll spoilers are connected to the pilot controls by control cable, permitting mechanical control on a temporary basis.

== See also ==
- Index of aviation articles
- Dual control (aviation)
