= LATAM Airlines Flight 800 =

2024 aviation accident over the Tasman Sea

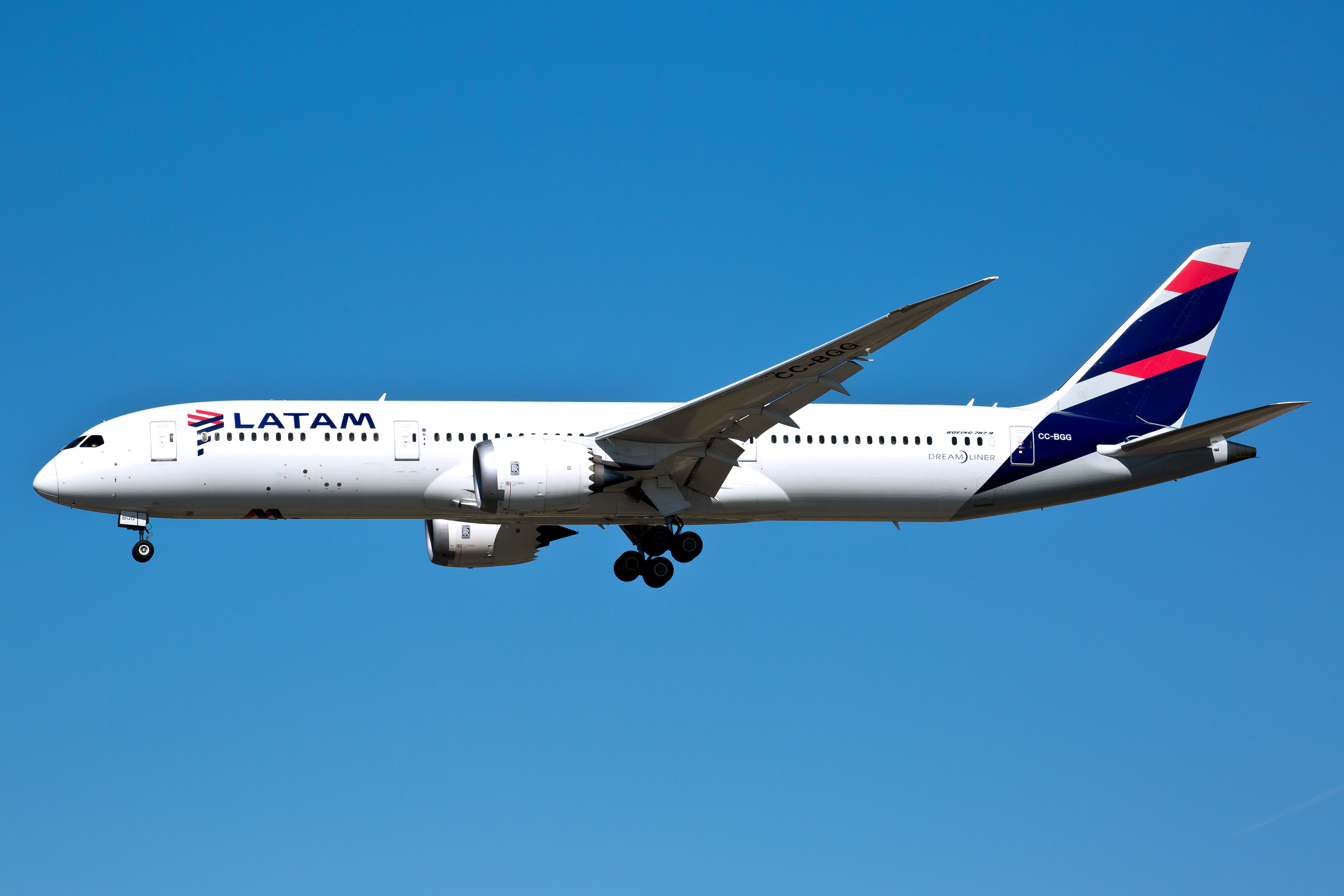
- CC-BGG, the aircraft involved in the accident, pictured in 2023

Accident
- Date: 11 March 2024
- Summary: In-flight upset
- Site: Tasman Sea, west of Auckland, New Zealand; 37°3′55″S 168°3′46″E

Aircraft
- Aircraft type: Boeing 787-9
- Operator: LATAM Airlines Chile
- IATA flight No.: LA800
- ICAO flight No.: LAN800
- Call sign: LAN CHILE 800
- Registration: CC-BGG
- Flight origin: Sydney Airport, Sydney, Australia
- Stopover: Auckland Airport, Auckland, New Zealand
- Destination: Arturo Merino Benítez International Airport, Santiago, Chile
- Occupants: 272
- Passengers: 263
- Crew: 9
- Fatalities: 0
- Injuries: 50
- Survivors: 272

LATAM Airlines Flight 800 was a scheduled international passenger flight from Sydney, Australia to Santiago, Chile, with a stopover at Auckland, New Zealand. On 11 March 2024, the Boeing 787 Dreamliner which operated that flight experienced an in-flight upset around two hours into the first leg of the flight. Of the 272 people on board, 50 were injured, with 12 taken to hospital after landing in Auckland.

== Aircraft and crew ==
The aircraft was a Boeing 787-9, MSN 38461, registered as CC-BGG, which was assembled by the Boeing Everett Factory in 2015. It first flew around December 2015 and was equipped with two Rolls-Royce Trent 1000 engines.

The aircraft had operated the outbound flight, LA801, from Santiago to Sydney via Auckland. After the incident, the onward leg to Santiago was cancelled. The aircraft remained in Auckland until 14 March, when it returned to Santiago.

The captain, age 44, had logged 12,526 flight hours, with 650 hours on a 787. The first officer, age 38, had 3,670 flight hours, with 470 hours on a 787.

== Accident ==
LATAM Airlines Flight 800 departed from Sydney Airport at 11:44 AEDT (00:44 UTC), climbing to cruise at flight level 410 (equal to 41,000 ft or 12,500 m).

While the flight was over the Tasman Sea, around two hours into the flight and one hour away from Auckland, the aircraft dropped suddenly. In a few seconds, the plane lost over 300 ft (90 m) of altitude. People and objects that were not restrained were thrown upwards, with around 30 to 40 people hitting the ceiling of the cabin, damaging multiple ceiling panels. One passenger said it felt "like an earthquake", and another recalled being thrown back four to five seat rows.

The aircraft continued to Auckland as scheduled, landing at 16:26 NZDT (03:26 UTC). Medical staff boarded the plane at Auckland Airport and treated the wounded, tending to 50 people, with reports of cuts and bruises, head and neck injuries, and broken bones. Twelve people were transported to the hospital, including one person in a serious condition. Four people were still hospitalised as of 14 March 2024.

== Investigation ==
As the incident occurred on a Chilean-registered aircraft over international waters, the Chilean Directorate General of Civil Aviation (DGAC) is responsible for investigating the incident, and began an inquiry on 12 March 2024. The New Zealand Transport Accident Investigation Commission (TAIC) assisted in the inquiry. The flight data recorder and cockpit voice recorder from the aircraft were recovered by the TAIC.

A passenger reported a pilot told them after landing that the instruments in the cockpit went blank when the plane fell, then came back online a few seconds later. It has also been reported that the inadvertent movement of a pilot's seat possibly caused the incident. A flight attendant could somehow have activated a covered rocker switch on the back of the pilot's seat. If the cover was loose, pressing on it would be enough to activate the switch underneath when it otherwise normally would not have. The activation of this switch would have slowly moved the seat forward into the control yoke, resulting in the nose down attitude, disengaging the autopilot, according to US industry officials.

=== Preliminary report ===
On 19 April 2024, the DGAC released their preliminary report regarding the accident. That investigation claimed that the captain's seat had involuntarily moved forward and that weather was not a factor.

=== Final report ===
On 22 February 2026, the DGAC released their final report on the accident. The report concluded that the captain exerted pressure on the control column sensor due to his accidental seat movement, which overrode the autopilot causing a temporary loss of control.

== Reactions ==
Boeing responded to the incident by stating "We are working to gather more information about the flight and will provide any support needed by our customers". The accident followed increased criticisms of Boeing for multiple in-flight problems on their aircraft.

LATAM Airlines apologized for the incident, stating, "We regret the inconvenience and injury this situation may have caused its passengers, and reiterates its commitment to safety as a priority within the framework of its operational standards".

The Federal Aviation Administration (FAA) responded to the incident in an undisclosed message, and in return Boeing released a statement regarding the flight, quoting "Based on the FAA audit, our quality stand downs and the recent expert panel report, we continue to implement immediate changes and develop a comprehensive action plan to strengthen safety and quality, and build the confidence of our customers and their passengers".

In response to the report of an issue with a seat switch being the likely cause of the accident, Boeing issued a memo reminding airlines of instructions issued in 2017 to inspect the cockpit chairs of 787 aircraft for loose switches. Boeing warned that closing a seat back switch cover onto a loose rocker switch could "potentially jam the rocker switch, resulting in unintended seat movement".

In August of 2024 the Federal Aviation Administration issued an airworthiness directive that asked for the inspection of the seat switches on the 787-8, 787-9 and 787-10 variants of the Dreamliner.

== See also ==
- Qantas Flight 72, a 2008 flight upset.
- Singapore Airlines Flight 321
