= Emergency airworthiness directive =

Official instruction issued to airlines

An emergency airworthiness directive (EAD) is an airworthiness directive issued when unsafe conditions require immediate action by an aircraft owner or operator. An EAD is published by a responsible authority such as the FOCA, EASA or FAA related to airworthiness and maintenance of aircraft and aircraft parts. It contains measures which must be accomplished and the related periods to preserve their airworthiness. Technical information is addressed to operators and maintenance organisations of affected aircraft only. EADs become effective upon receipt of notification.

== Notable incidents that have led to emergency airworthiness directives ==
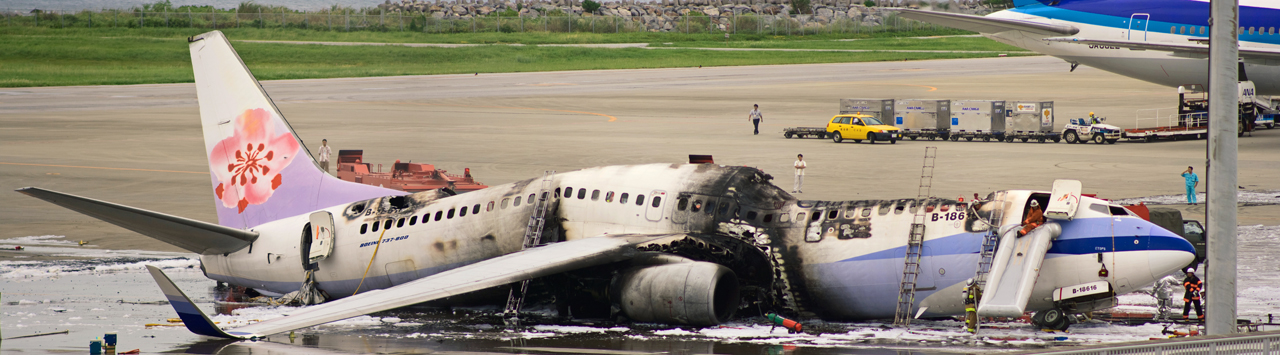
The burnt-out wreckage of China Airlines Flight 120; following this incident, the FAA issued an emergency airworthiness directive.

- On May 25, 1979, American Airlines Flight 191, a McDonnell Douglas DC-10 crashed after takeoff from Chicago O'Hare Airport. An engine separated from the plane, damaging electrical and hydraulic systems, causing the left wing's slats to retract and stall that wing. This led to the type being grounded in June 1979.
- On August 20, 2007, China Airlines Flight 120, a Boeing 737-800 inbound from Taipei, caught fire shortly after landing at Naha Airport in Okinawa Prefecture, Japan. There were no fatalities. Following this incident, the FAA issued an Emergency Airworthiness Directive on August 25 ordering inspection of all Boeing 737NG series aircraft for loose components in the wing leading edge slats within 24 days.
- On October 7, 2008, Qantas Flight 72, a scheduled flight from Singapore Changi Airport to Perth Airport made an emergency landing at Learmonth airport near the town of Exmouth, Western Australia, following a pair of sudden uncommanded pitch-down manoeuvres that resulted in serious injuries to many of the occupants. The aircraft was equipped with a Northrop Grumman–made ADIRS, which investigators sent to the manufacturer in the US for further testing. On January 15, 2009, the EASA issued an Emergency Airworthiness Directive to address the above A330 and A340 Northrop-Grumman ADIRU problem of incorrectly responding to a defective inertial reference.The aircraft is a A330-303. All survived but there was 107 injuries.
- On January 16, 2013, the FAA issued an emergency airworthiness directive ordering all U.S. airlines to ground the Boeing 787s in their fleets due to problems with the aircraft's lithium-ion battery. The directive came after the second incident of battery fire aboard the aircraft. This was the first time that the FAA had issued a general grounding of an aircraft model since 1979's DC-10 grounding.
- On November 7, 2018, nine days after the crash of Lion Air flight JT610 which killed all 189 people on board, the Federal Aviation Administration issued an emergency airworthiness directive concerning a possible problem with the AoA (Angle of Attack) display of the Boeing 737 MAX 8 and MAX 9 aircraft types.
- On January 6, 2024, the FAA issued an EAD grounding all Boeing 737 MAX 9 aircraft for inspections, following an incident one day earlier on Alaska Airlines Flight 1282 where a door plug blew out while the flight was underway, leading to uncontrolled decompression of the cabin and subsequent emergency landing of the aircraft involved.
- On November 8, 2025, the FAA issued an EAD grounding all McDonnell Douglas MD-11 aircraft after UPS Airlines Flight 2976 suffered an engine separation on takeoff and crashed into an industrial area, killing all three pilots and at least 11 people on the ground. On November 14, 2025, FAA updated the EAD grounding to expanded to all McDonnell Douglas DC-10 for the same reason.
- On November 28, 2025, the EASA issued an EAD regarding the elevator aileron computers (ELAC) on the Airbus A320 family of aircraft, ordering that all operators modify and replace the ELAC on all A320 family aircraft before continued flights. Airbus stated that the problem was related to intense solar radiation, was capable of corrupting data to flight control systems. The directive was issued during the investigation into JetBlue Flight 1230, which experienced a sudden pitch-down event in-flight off the coast of Florida.
