= Inertial reference unit =

Type of avionics and astrionics sensor

An inertial reference unit (IRU) is a type of inertial sensor which uses gyroscopes (electromechanical, ring laser gyro or MEMS) and accelerometers (electromechanical or MEMS) to determine a moving aircraft’s or spacecraft’s change in rotational attitude (angular orientation relative to some reference frame) and translational position (typically latitude, longitude and altitude) over a period of time. In other words, an IRU allows a device, whether airborne or submarine, to travel from one point to another without reference to external information.

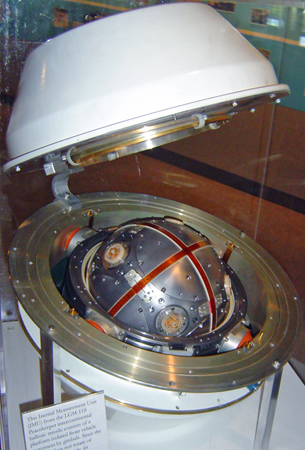
The inertial reference unit from a Peacekeeper inter-continental ballistic missile (ICBM)

Another name often used interchangeably with IRU is Inertial Measurement Unit. The two basic classes of IRUs/IMUs are "gimballed" and "strapdown". The older, larger gimballed systems have become less prevalent over the years as the performance of newer, smaller strapdown systems has improved greatly via the use of solid-state sensors and advanced real-time computer algorithms. Gimballed systems are still used in some high-precision applications where strapdown performance may not be as good.

== See also ==
- Air data inertial reference unit
- Inertial measurement unit
