= Air data module =

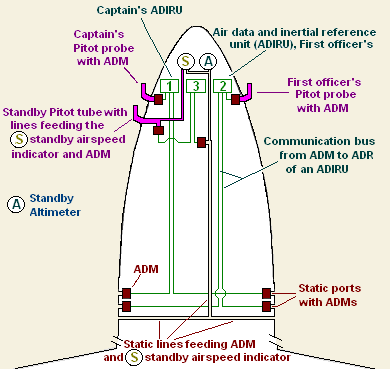
Illustration of the airspeed indication and detection system on fly-by-wire aircraft

An air data module is a component of the navigation system. Each unit converts pneumatic (air pressure) information from a pitot tube or a static port into numerical information which is sent on a data bus. This pressure information is received and processed by the Air Data Reference (ADR) component of the Air Data Inertial Reference Unit (ADIRU). This processed information is then sent to one or more display management computers that present information on the cockpit's primary flight display. Airspeed information is also sent to the flight computers and other electronics, including the autoflight subsystem (e.g. flight management and guidance system).

== Construction ==
The air data module is a gas pressure sensor which converts mechanical forces created by gas pressure into digital signals that can be carried to the air data reference unit. ADMs generally have a maintenance bus and communication bus, and a connector on the housing for a pressurized gas line that is connected to the pitot tube or static ports. The maintenance bus can be EIA-485 and the communication bus can be ARINC 429
