= Flight control computer =

Component in fly-by-wire avionics systems

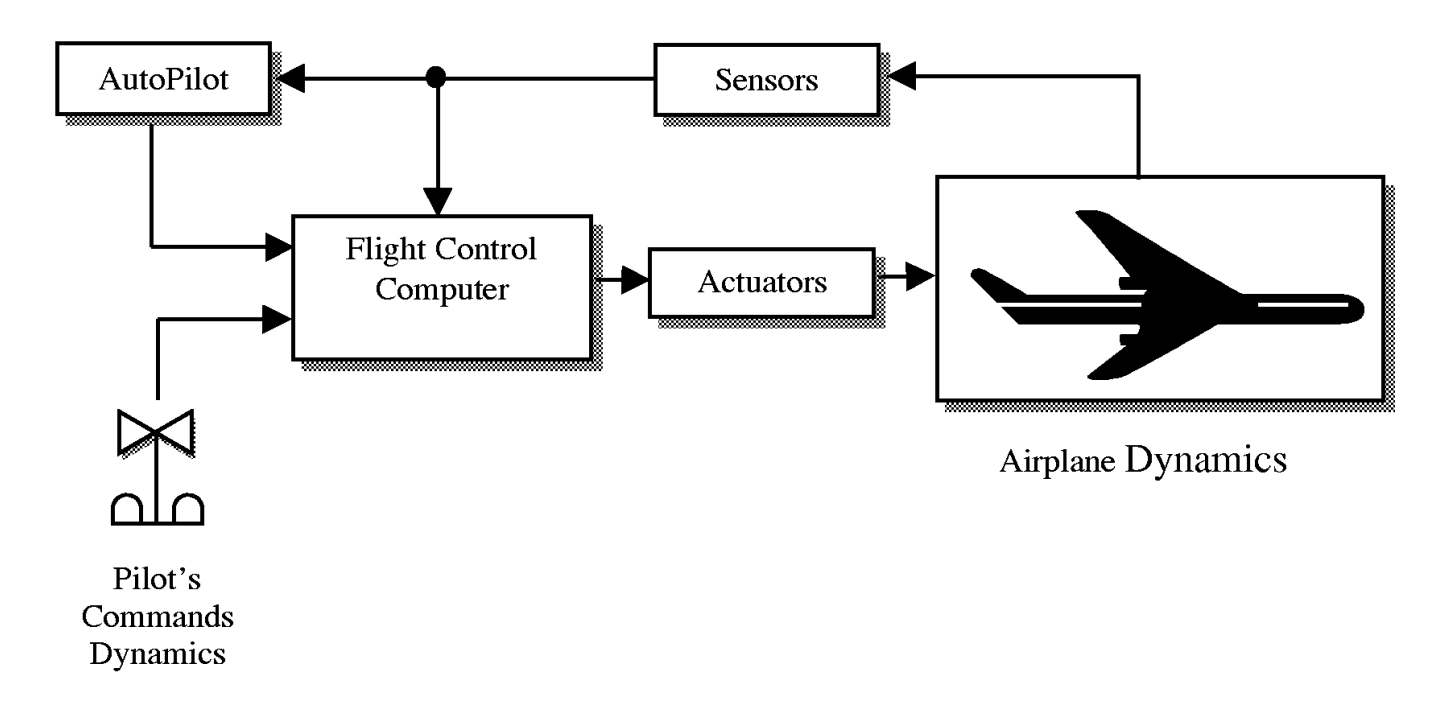
Abstract representation of a Fly-By-Wire flight system

A flight control computer (FCC) is a primary component of the avionics system found in fly-by-wire aircraft. It is a specialized computer system that can create artificial flight characteristics and improve handling characteristics by automating a variety of in-flight tasks which reduce the workload on the cockpit flight crew.

A flight control computer receives and processes data from a multitude of sensors throughout the aircraft. These sensors monitor variables such as airspeed, altitude, and attitude (the aircraft's orientation in three-dimensional space). Embedded within integrated avionics packages, it executes critical functions such as guidance, navigation. It also controls the plane's flight control surfaces, such as the ailerons, elevators, and rudder. A dedicated flight control computer handles high-level computational tasks, including routing, autopilot functions, and flight management. This computer interfaces with the avionics system and is responsible for displaying flight data on the cockpit's flight deck.

The flight control system must be fault tolerant, and for that purpose there can exist several primary flight control computers (PFCC) and secondary flight control computers (SFCC), which monitors the data output from PFCC and in the case of failure, SFCC can take over the flight controls.

In the Boeing 777 there are three primary flight control computers located in the aircraft's electronic equipment bay, responsible for computing and transmitting commands for normal mode flight control surfaces to maintain normal flight, including rudder, elevators, ailerons, flaperons, horizontal stabilizer, multi-functional spoilers, and ground spoilers.
