= Dual control (aviation) =

Dual control is an arrangement in which aircraft control is accessible by both the aircraft pilot and co-pilot/radar intercept officer. This is mostly found on trainer aircraft where the flight instructor is the predominant pilot.

== See also ==
- Index of aviation articles
- Redundancy (engineering)
