= 1975 Tan Son Nhut Lockheed C-5 crash =

1975 aviation accident in South Vietnam

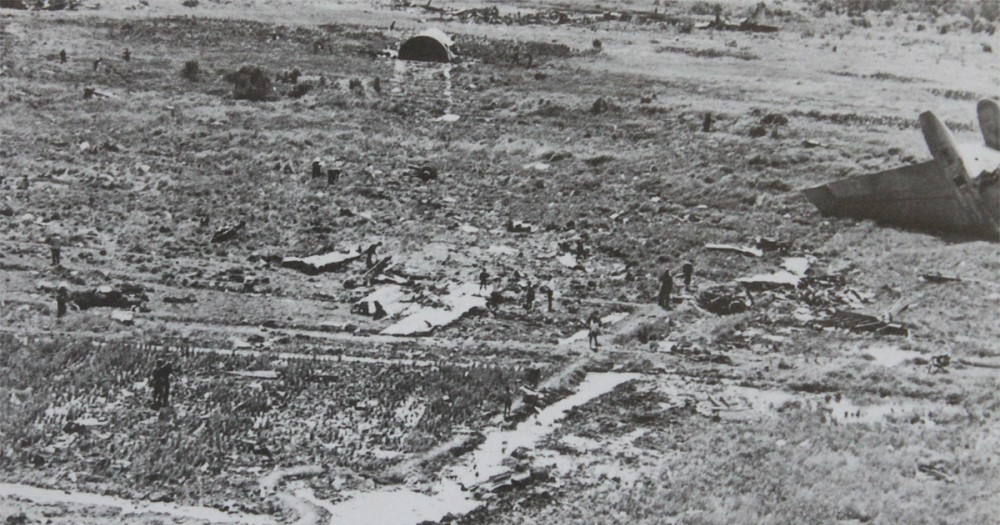
- Aerial view of the crash site

Accident
- Date: 4 April 1975 (Note: The crash date is widely reported as 3 April, 4 April, and 5 April, however newspaper reports from 1975 reference a Friday afternoon crash (4 April) and an official military history dates the crash as 4 April.)
- Summary: Explosive decompression due to improper maintenance leading to explosion of cargo door
- Site: Near Tan Son Nhut Air Base, Saigon, South Vietnam; 10°50′14.99″N 106°41′30.59″E

Aircraft
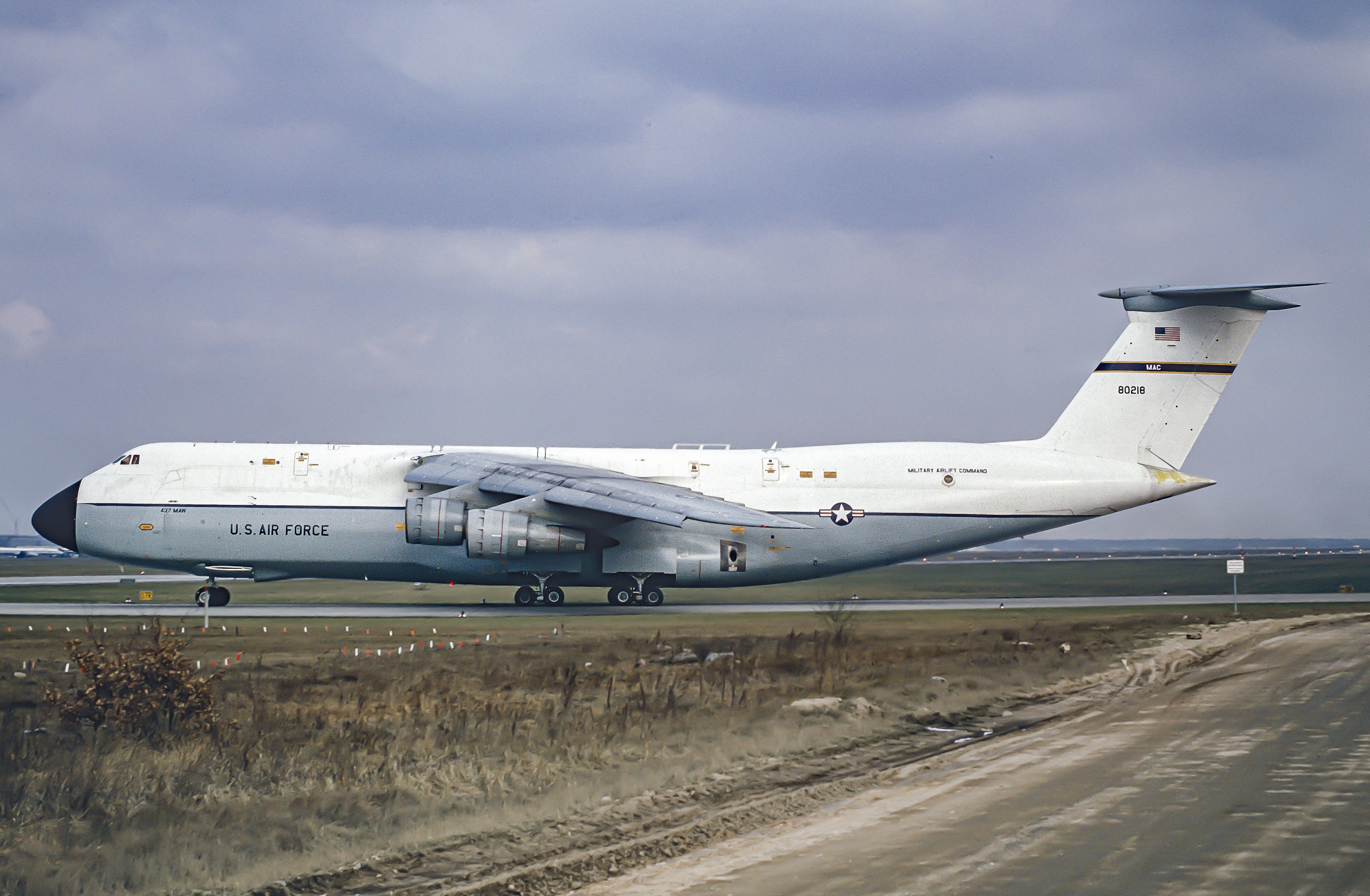
- 68-0218, the aircraft involved in the accident, seen in 1971
- Aircraft type: Lockheed C-5A Galaxy
- Operator: United States Air Force
- Registration: 68-0218
- Flight origin: Tan Son Nhut Air Base, Saigon, South Vietnam
- Destination: Clark Air Base, Philippines
- Occupants: 314
- Passengers: 285
- Crew: 29
- Fatalities: 138 (Note: The number of fatalities vary depending on the source, but official accounts state 138 of 314 on board were killed.)
- Injuries: 176
- Survivors: 176

On 4 April 1975, a Lockheed C-5A Galaxy participating in the first mission of Operation Babylift crashed on approach during an emergency landing at Tan Son Nhut Air Base, South Vietnam. The cause was ascribed to loss of flight control due to explosive decompression and structural failure. The accident, which killed 138 of the 314 people aboard the plane, marked the second operational loss and first fatal crash for the C-5 Galaxy fleet and is the third deadliest accident involving a U.S. military aircraft, after the 1968 Kham Duc C-130 shootdown and Arrow Air Flight 1285R (1985).

== Background ==
In early April 1975, with much of South Vietnam overrun by communist North Vietnamese forces, the administration of U.S. President Gerald Ford began evacuating American citizens. To avoid alarming the host country, U.S. Ambassador to South Vietnam Graham Martin authorized Americans to be flown out under several conditions, one of which was Operation Babylift, in which American caregivers were paired with South Vietnamese orphans.

== Description ==
On the afternoon of Friday, 4 April 1975, a C-5A, AF Ser. No. 68-0218, making the inaugural flight of Operation Babylift, departed Tan Son Nhut Air Base for Clark Air Base in the Philippines. This first group of orphans would then transfer to charter flights and be welcomed by President Ford upon arriving in the United States in San Diego, California. At 4:15 p.m. the C-5A was over the South China Sea, about 13 nautical miles (24 km) off Vũng Tàu, South Vietnam, flying a heading of 136 degrees and climbing to an altitude of 23,000 ft (7,010 m). At that moment the locks on the rear loading ramp failed, causing the cargo door to open explosively. This caused an explosive decompression, temporarily filling the cabin with a whirlwind of fog and debris. The blowout severed control cables to the tail, causing two of four hydraulic systems to fail, including those for the rudder and elevator, and leaving the flight control with the use of only one aileron, spoilers, and power.

The pilot, Captain Dennis "Bud" Traynor (aged 30 at the time of the incident); copilot, Captain Tilford Harp (aged 28 at the time of the incident); and flight engineer, Master Sergeant Allen Engles, attempted to regain control of the airplane, and to perform a 180-degree turn in order to return to Tan Son Nhut. The aircraft began to exhibit phugoid oscillations, but the crew countered them and maintained a controlled descent at about 250 to 260 knots (460 to 480 km/h). They were able to bring the plane to 4,000 ft (1,220 m) and begin the approach to Tan Son Nhut's runway 25L. While turning on final approach, the plane's descent rate suddenly began to increase rapidly. The crew increased power to the engines in an attempt to arrest the descent, but despite their efforts, the plane touched down at 4:45 p.m. in a rice paddy, and skidded for a quarter of a mile (400 m), became airborne again for another half-mile (800 m), crossing the Saigon River, then hit a dike and broke up into four pieces. The fuel caught fire and some of the wreckage was set ablaze.

Survivors struggled to extricate themselves from the wreckage. The crash site was in a muddy rice paddy near the Saigon River, one mile (1.6 km) from the nearest road. Most of the survivors were in the upper deck, while most of the people in the lower deck were killed. Fire engines could not reach the site, and helicopters had to set down some distance from the wreckage. About 100 South Vietnamese soldiers deployed around the site, near where an engagement with the Viet Cong had taken place the previous night. Out of 314 people on board, the death toll included 78 children, 35 Defense Attaché Office employees and 11 U.S. Air Force personnel; there were 176 survivors. All of the surviving orphans were eventually flown to the United States. The dead orphans were cremated and were interred at the cemetery of the St. Nikolaus Catholic Church in Pattaya, Thailand. The accident would also "stand as the single largest loss of life" in the Defense Intelligence Agency's history until the September 11 attacks because among the crash fatalities were five DIA employees.

=== Aftermath ===
Some members of the United States Congress called for a grounding of C-5s. In the end, the fleet was put under severe operational restrictions for several months while the cause was established. The U.S. Air Force Accident Investigation Board attributed the survival of any on board to Captain Traynor's unorthodox use of power and his decision to crash land while the aircraft still allowed him some control. Captains Traynor and Harp, who both survived, were awarded the Air Force Cross for extraordinary valor. Thirty-seven medals were awarded to crew members or their next of kin. USAF Flight Nurse 1st Lieutenant Regina Aune received the Cheney Award for 1975.

== Investigation ==
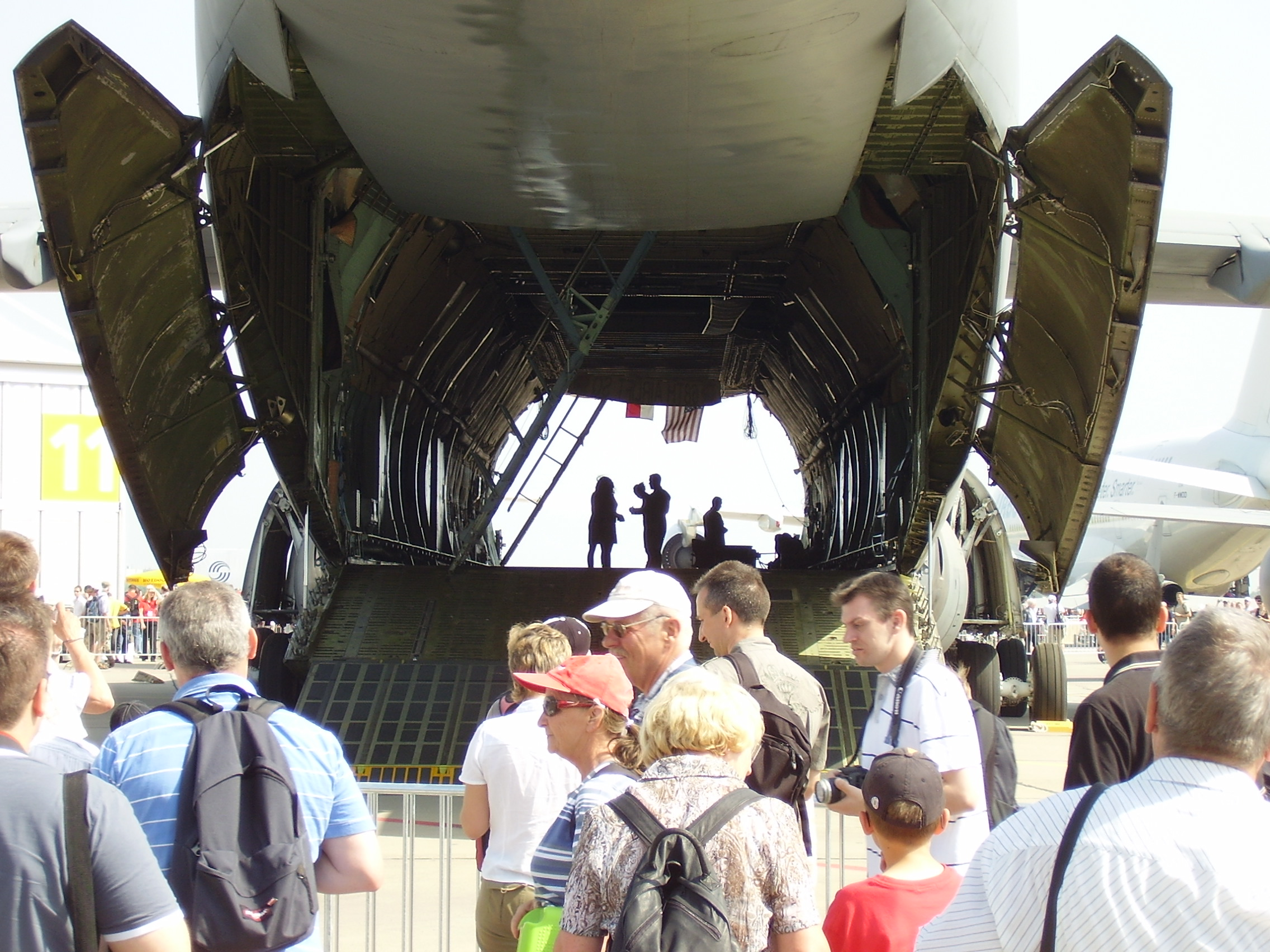
Rear doors of a C-5 Galaxy

Given the explosive manner in which the rear doors failed, sabotage was initially suspected.

Many of the components were looted from the crash site, thereby complicating the investigation; the U.S. Air Force paid a bounty for parts from the wreckage to recover them from the local populace. The United States Navy rescue salvage USS Deliver, fleet tug USS Abnaki (ATF-96) amphibious cargo ship USS Durham, frigate USS Reasoner, and command ship USS Blue Ridge were assigned to search for the flight data recorder in the South China Sea. The rear hatch and flight recorder were found by the USS Abnaki and USS Deliver and helicopters also discovered wreckage from the doors in the South China Sea as well as the body of a crew member aboard the C-5.

When the rear doors were eventually recovered from the sea, investigators determined that some of the locks had not engaged properly. Maintenance records showed that some locks from other C-5s had been cannibalized for spares and improperly refitted, which then degraded their performance significantly. Accounts also indicated the initial maintenance inspection noticed that five of the seven locks were not operating and failed while the aircraft was performing the flight. With external organizational pressure to get the flight airborne, a second off-shift maintenance team was called in. They missed the locks during their inspection, and the unairworthy aircraft was cleared for flight. Furthermore, the flight crew confirmed that they had encountered difficulty closing the doors before take-off, having to open and close the doors multiple times to make them lock. As the air pressure differential increased with altitude, the few locks that were working correctly were unable to bear the load, and the door failed in flight, leading to the subsequent explosive decompression, flight control problems and ultimately, the crash.

== In popular culture ==
The story of the disaster was featured on the seventh season of the Canadian-made, internationally distributed documentary series Mayday, distributed as 'Air Disasters' in the U.S., in the episode "Operation Babylift".

== See also ==
- United Airlines Flight 811
- American Airlines Flight 96
- Turkish Airlines Flight 981
- Evergreen International Airlines Flight 17
- Alaska Airlines Flight 1282
- Tropical Airways Flight 1301
- Japan Air Lines Flight 123
- United Airlines Flight 232
- China Airlines Flight 611
- American Airlines Flight 191
