= Tropical Airways Flight 1301 =

2003 Haiti domestic short-haul passenger flight crash

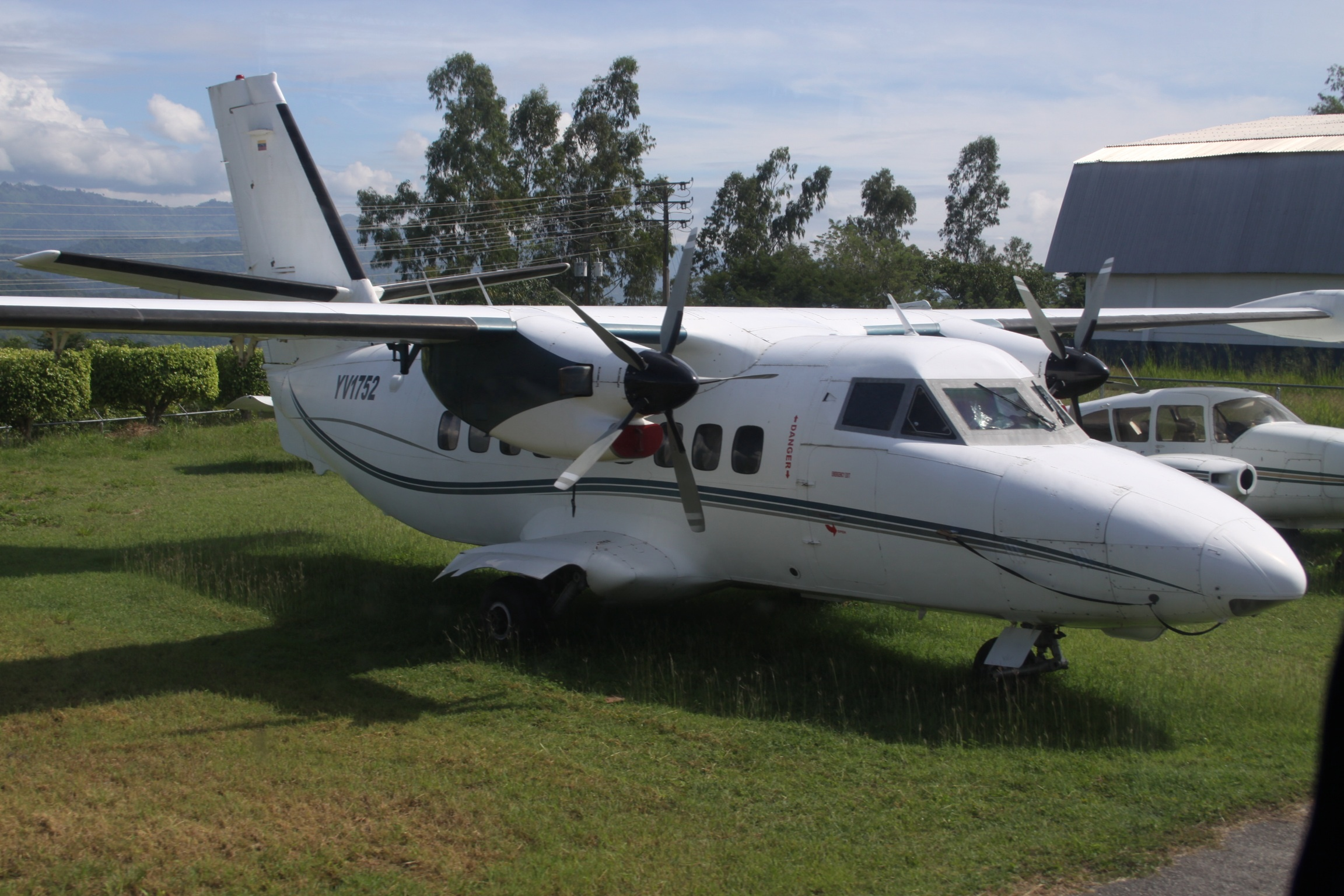
- A Let L-410 similar to the one involved in the crash

Accident
- Date: 24 August 2003
- Summary: Stalled, cargo door opened in mid-flight, pilot error
- Site: Near Cap-Haïtien International Airport, Cap-Haïtien, Haiti; 19°44′06″N 72°12′23″W

Aircraft
- Aircraft type: Let L-410UVP-E3
- Operator: Tropical Airways
- Registration: HH-PRV
- Flight origin: Cap-Haïtien International Airport, Cap-Haïtien, Haiti
- Destination: Port-de-Paix Airport, Port-de-Paix, Haiti
- Passengers: 19
- Crew: 2
- Fatalities: 21
- Survivors: 0

Tropical Airways Flight 1301 (TBG1301/M71301) was a domestic short-haul passenger flight, flying from Cap-Haïtien International Airport in Cap-Haïtien, Haiti to the commune of Port-de-Paix which crashed onto a sugarcane field less than 10 minutes after takeoff on the evening of 24 August 2003. The aircraft was a 19-seater Let L-410 Turbolet carrying 19 passengers and 2 crew. Witnesses stated that the aircraft caught fire during take-off and exploded when it hit the ground. All on board were killed.

The crash is currently the second deadliest aircraft crash in Haiti and the second worst accident involving a Let L-410 Turbolet, after Sakha Avia Flight 301. The Haitian investigative board stated that multiple factors caused the crash, one of which was an opened cargo door during mid-flight. The pilots were struggling to return to the airport. Poor CRM (Crew resource management) contributed to the crash.

== Flight ==
Nationality	Crew	Passengers	Total
Haiti/France	0	19	19
Spain	1	0	1
United States	1	0	1
Total	2	19	21

The flight was a daily domestic flight operated by Tropical Airways, the national airline of Haiti at the time. The airline was authorized to operate by the Ministry of Commerce of the Republic of Haiti on 1 June 1998. The National Civil Aviation Office issued the Operating licence on 12 February 1999 The flight was operated by a Let L-410UVP-E3 registered as HH-PRV and was carrying 19 passengers and 2 crews. All except the crew were Haitian-French nationals; the Captain was an American and the co-pilot was Spanish. It was flying from Cap-Haïtien, the capital of the Department of Nord on the north coast of Haiti to Port-de-Paix, the capital of the Nord-Ouest department.

Flight 1301 took off on Runway 05 at Cap-Haïtien International Airport at around 04:50 p.m local time. During take off, Air Traffic Control workers in the control tower saw the cargo door open. While the controller was preparing to tell Flight 1301 about the problem, the crew asked for permission to return to the airport. Permission was granted for the flight to join a right downwind leg for landing. The aircraft turned to the left, crashed, skidded and exploded, followed by thick black smoke. Local residents and rescuers rushed to the scene to find the charred and scattered wreckage in a sugarcane field about 2 kilometres (1.2 mi; 1.1 nmi) from the airport. All 21 people on board were killed. Most of them were charred beyond recognition.

== Investigation ==
The flight was not equipped with a Cockpit Voice Recorder nor a Flight Data Recorder, therefore the investigation relied on the wreckage of the aircraft and the air traffic controller recording. A number of components were extracted from the wreckage for analysis. The propellers were examined by a delegation sent by the manufacturer Avia Hamilton and the Czech Civil Aviation. Investigators revealed that these propellers were still rotating at high revolutions at impact and none of them were in the feathered position after impact. The position of the flaps was also analyzed. Investigative commission stated that the flaps were in "full down" 42° position.

The controller stated that after the crew reported the problem with the cargo door and started a turn toward the airport, the pilot seemed to have the aircraft under control. The controller stated that the plane could have made it to the airport. However, the altitude was much lower than normal.

The Let L-410 manufacturer's test pilot's report mentions the following: "In a flight configuration (right turn at low altitude) where the weight was either excessive or at the maximum limit, the flaps extended to maximum (42° full down); could significantly reduce the speed of the aircraft. During the turn, the rudder could be in an uncoordinated position and the engines generate asymmetric thrust." The combination of these factors could critically increase the drag caused the plane to enter a stall condition. In the examination of the carcass of the engines, there is no evidence that a fire broke out before impact.

Investigative team could not determine the total weight of Flight 1301 since there was no documentation on the weight of the aircraft and cargo.

The Captain's record indicated that he was qualified and had passed the flight proficiency test in accordance with the applicable rules. It indicated that during the three months prior to the accident, he worked normally according to a 7/7 schedule, that is to say 7 days of work followed by 7 days of rest. However, the Committee noted that during the month of August, the month in which the accident occurred, that schedule had been interrupted. From August 9 to 24, the Captain was overworked and was possibly sleep deprived. Haitian investigators then stated that the Captain could have been fatigued during the crash.

=== Conclusion ===
Haitian investigators published the cause of the accident as a stall during the approach phase while on the downwind leg caused by the loss control due to a speed below that required to maintain control.

Contributing factors were:

- failure of the crew to manage the approach procedure (Poor CRM)
  - use of maximum flaps (42°)
  - insufficient altitude
  - lack of coordination between crew members
- possible state of fatigue of the Captain
- possible excess weight
- opening of the baggage hold door, observed during takeoff.

== See also ==
- American Airlines Flight 96 – rapid decompression caused by a cargo door malfunction
- Turkish Airlines Flight 981 – explosive decompression caused by a cargo door malfunction
- United Airlines Flight 811 - explosive decompression caused by cargo door failure
- Evergreen International Airlines Flight 17 - cargo door failure due to design flaw, pilot error and inadequate procedures; loss of control for undetermined reasons
- 1975 Tân Sơn Nhứt C-5 accident – loss of control caused by failure of locking mechanism for the aft pressure door
- Alaska Airlines Flight 1282 - explosive decompression caused by door plug failure
