= Tropical Airways =

Airline based in Port-au-Prince, Haiti

IATA	ICAO	Call sign
M7	TBG	—
- Fleet size: 4
- Destinations: 6
- Headquarters: Port-au-Prince, Haiti

Tropical Airways was a small airline with scheduled and charter services based in Port-au-Prince, Haiti.

== Services ==
Prior to shutting down, Tropical Airways operated the following services:

- Domestic scheduled destinations: Port-au-Prince to Cap-Haïtien, Jérémie and Port-de-Paix.
- International scheduled destinations: Nassau, Bahamas and Providenciales, in the Turks and Caicos Islands

== Accidents and incidents ==
- On August 24, 2003, a Tropical Airways Let L-410 Turbolet commuter turboprop airliner en route from Cap-Haïtien to Port-de-Paix crashed in a sugar cane field. All 21 passengers died in the fiery crash. An official at Cap-Haïtien's airport said the 19-passenger aircraft departed with too many people aboard and too much baggage. Witnesses on the ground say they saw smoke billowing from the plane and luggage falling out of the aircraft's rear door.

== Fleet ==
According to Flight International magazine, the Tropical Airways fleet as of August 2006 consisted of the following aircraft:

- 4 Let L-410 UVP

Earlier fleet information, from February 2005, identified just three planes in the fleet:

- 1 DHC Dash 8
- 1 Cessna Grand Caravan.
- 1 Shorts SD 360-300
