= Dan Applegate =

American aerospace engineer (1917–1999)

- Born: Frederick Daniel Applegate; November 9, 1917; Lansing, Michigan, U.S.
- Died: January 17, 1999 (aged 81); San Diego, California, U.S.
- Occupation: Director of Product Engineering for Convair
- Known for: "Applegate memorandum"

Frederick Daniel Applegate (November 9, 1917 – January 17, 1999) was director of product engineering for Convair, a McDonnell Douglas subcontractor supplying parts for the company's newest aircraft, the DC-10 trijet, during the early 1970s.

On 12 June 1972, American Airlines Flight 96, a relatively new McDonnell Douglas DC-10, was severely damaged after losing a rear cargo door while flying over Windsor, Ontario, while en route to Buffalo Niagara International Airport. The pilots very nearly lost control of the trijet, but they were able to land the aircraft safely using differential throttling to control the glide angle. In the ensuing investigation, it was learned that the door had improperly latched due to a combination of a minor electrical problem, and the failure of a locking mechanism that was supposed to ensure that the latches were in place, but could, in reality, be forced closed even if they were not.

The "Applegate memorandum" was written shortly after the Flight 96 incident, on 27 June, and delivered to Applegate's immediate supervisor J.B. Hurt. Applegate voiced his concerns to management about potential design faults in the door. In his view, these faults could cause the aircraft's cargo doors to open mid-flight. Should this occur, there would be an instantaneous loss of pressurization of the cargo area. It followed that the pressurised passenger cabin floor, which lay just above, would buckle under the force exerted on it, with probably disastrous consequences. Applegate noted that this precise failure had occurred during ground testing of the DC-10 in 1970. He believed that if this were to happen in flight, the plane's critical control systems and control lines (which ran through the floor) would be either severely damaged or completely destroyed, and the pilots would lose control of the aircraft. A potentially fatal crash would seem imminent.

The report included the following:

The potential for long term Convair liability has been causing me increasing concern for several reasons… The fundamental safety of the cargo door latching system has been progressively degraded since the program began in 1968... The airplane demonstrated an inherent susceptibility to catastrophic failure when exposed to explosive decompression of the cargo compartment in 1970 ground tests.

Since Murphy's Law being what it is, cargo doors will come open sometime during the twenty-plus years of use ahead for the DC-10... I would expect this to usually result in the loss of the aircraft.

Management believed that his proposed changes would be costly to implement, and there was some debate about who would end up paying for them, Convair or McDonnell Douglas. Applegate's suggestions to upgrade the door, and especially the cabin floor, would have required the aircraft to be grounded, an expensive proposition. Instead, a set of relatively minor changes was made, intended to ensure that the latches were properly seated and the locking handle could not be operated if they were not. These changes were limited to strengthening some of the locking system's parts, and adding a small window to allow handlers to visually inspect the latches. However, baggage handlers were not informed of the window's purpose.

In 1974 Turkish Airlines Flight 981 crashed on the outskirts of Paris killing all 346 people on board. It was later ascertained that the crash was due to the same technical shortcomings and subsequent chain of events Applegate had foreseen two years prior. One change among those introduced after the Flight 96 incident had not been made to the Turkish Airlines Flight 981 aircraft, in spite of manufacturing logs indicating that it had.

Introduced as part of a series of lawsuits following the Flight 981 crash, the Applegate memorandum was an important piece of evidence in what turned out to be one of the largest civil lawsuits in history.

== See also ==
- List of accidents and incidents involving commercial aircraft
