= Boeing manufacturing and design issues =

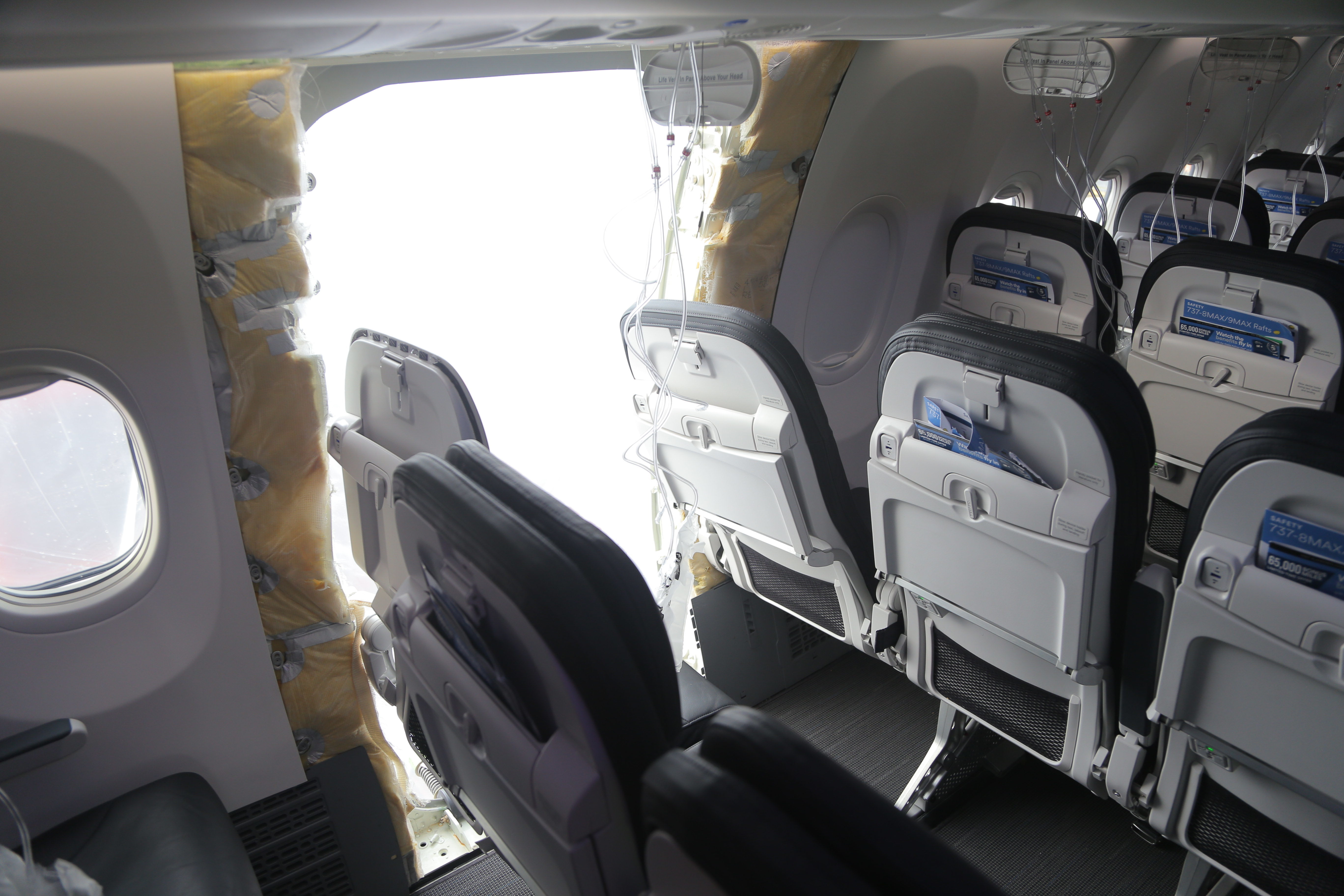
A door plug ejected from Alaska Airlines Flight 1282 in January 2024 as a result of a manufacturing issue.

A number of significant oversights have occurred in the manufacturing of aircraft produced by Boeing. Such oversights have been reported in the news as far back as 1987. Scrutiny over Boeing's process of addressing manufacturing issues began increasing in the aftermath of two fatal crashes involving the Boeing 737 MAX–Lion Air Flight 610 in late 2018 and Ethiopian Airlines Flight 302 in early 2019.

In August 2023, Boeing discovered improperly installed aft pressure bulkheads in certain Boeing 737 MAX aircraft. Concerns over Boeing manufacturing issues mounted in January 2024, when a door plug ejected from Alaska Airlines Flight 1282, causing uncontrolled decompression. The Federal Aviation Administration and the National Transportation Safety Board initiated inquiries in response to the incident; the former's investigation discovered further instances of manufacturing lapses.

== Manufacturing issues ==
=== Aft pressure bulkheads ===
In August 2023, Boeing discovered improperly drilled holes in aft pressure bulkheads in certain 737 MAX aircraft, forcing manufacturing delays.

=== Rudder control systems ===
In December 2023, Boeing urged airlines to inspect 737 MAX aircraft for loose bolts in their rudder control systems after an unnamed international airline discovered a bolt with a missing nut. Boeing discovered an additional improperly-tightened nut in an undelivered 737 MAX.

=== Door panels ===
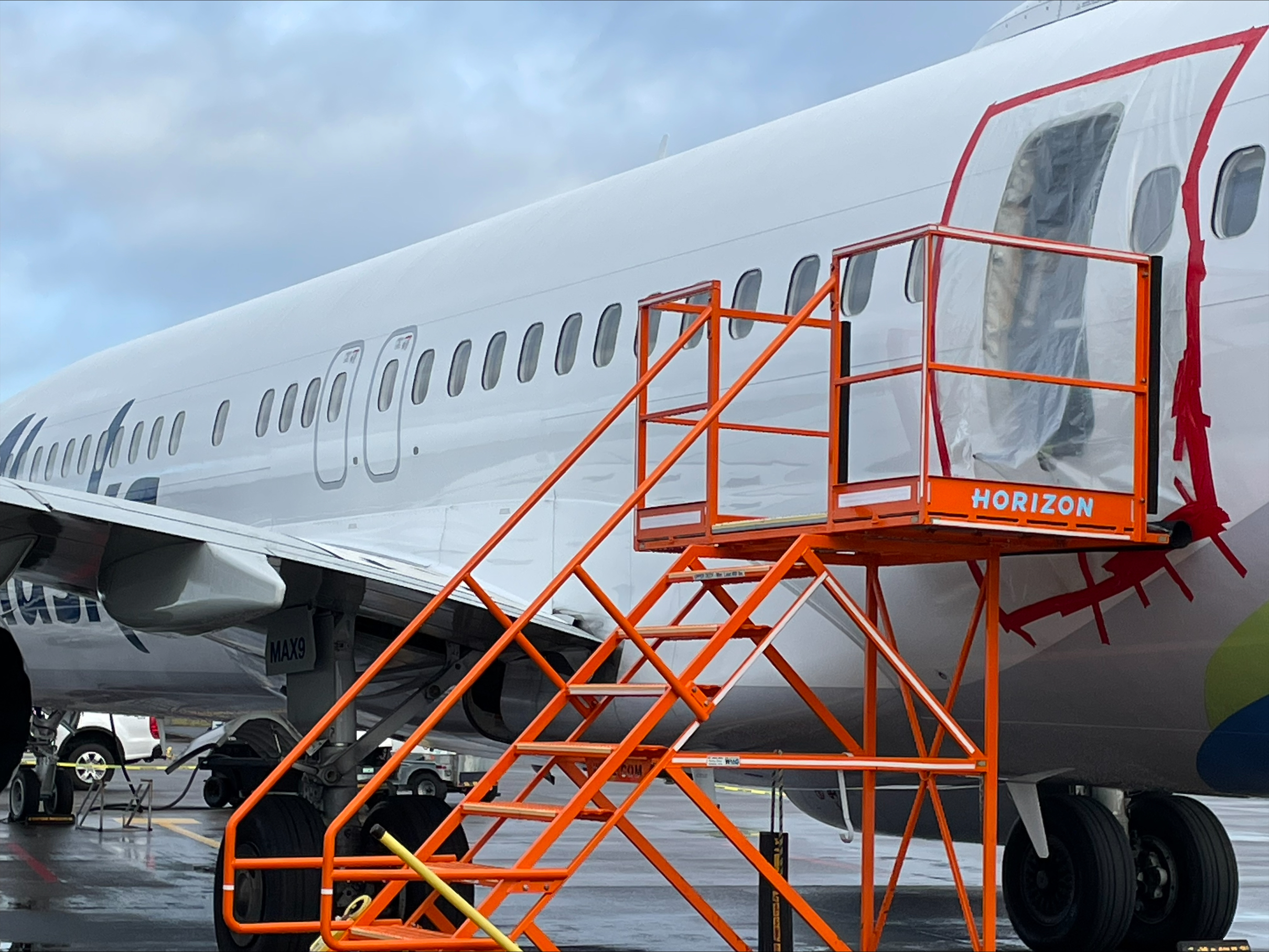
The Boeing 737 MAX 9 involved in Alaska Airlines Flight 1282.

On January 5, 2024, Alaska Airlines Flight 1282 experienced uncontrolled decompression after door plugs securing the emergency exit door panel ejected on the Boeing 737 MAX 9 aircraft used on the flight; the configuration on the 737 MAX 9 included fewer seats than Boeing designs for, necessitating a door plug to obstruct an unneeded exit on row 26 adjacent to two unoccupied seats. The fuselage and door plugs were initially manufactured by Spirit AeroSystems and the 737 MAX 9 involved in the incident was certified in November.

=== Fuselage gaps ===
In April 2024, Boeing engineer and whistleblower Sam Salehpour alleged that Boeing took shortcuts in the manufacturing of its 777 and 787. When joining the different parts of the fuselage together, Salehpour alleged that the tiny gaps were not filled. He claims there are thousands of affected aircraft that can catastrophically "break up" in mid air. Boeing denied these allegations.

== Responses ==
Following Alaska Airlines Flight 1282, the Federal Aviation Administration ordered a mass grounding of Boeing 737 MAX 9 planes in order to conduct inspections. Alaska Airlines canceled approximately one hundred flights on January 6, 2024, and United Airlines suspended uninspected 737 MAX 9s, leading to sixty cancellations. By January 7, Alaska Airlines had canceled 170 flights, affecting 25,000 customers.

== Investigations ==
=== National Transportation Safety Board ===
The National Transportation Safety Board initiated an inquiry into Boeing following Alaska Airlines Flight 1282, discovering that bolts intended to secure a fuselage panel were not installed prior to the flight.

=== Federal Aviation Administration ===
In March 2024, The New York Times reported that Boeing failed nearly three dozen audits during an examination.

=== U.S. Department of Justice ===
In March 2024, The Wall Street Journal reported that the United States Department of Justice had started a criminal investigation into Boeing, interviewing the crew on Alaska Airlines Flight 1282.

== See also ==
- John Barnett (whistleblower)
- Boeing Starliner
