= Alaska Airlines Flight 1282 =

2024 aviation accident over Oregon

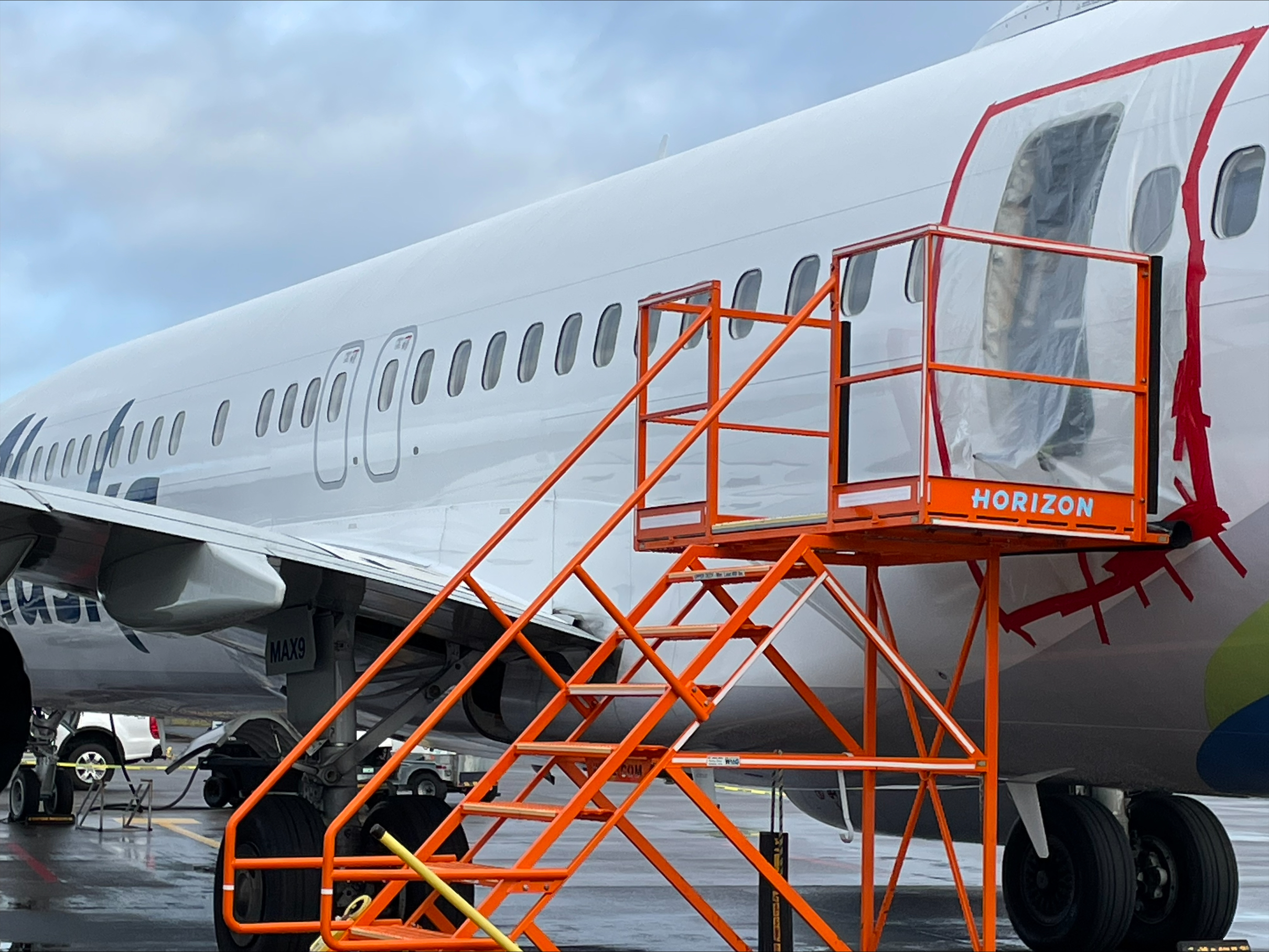
- The aircraft with plastic sheeting covering the missing door plug

Accident
- Date: January 5, 2024
- Summary: Uncontrolled decompression after loss of incorrectly installed door plug
- Site: In-air; near Portland, Oregon, United States; 45°27′15″N 122°45′20″W

Aircraft
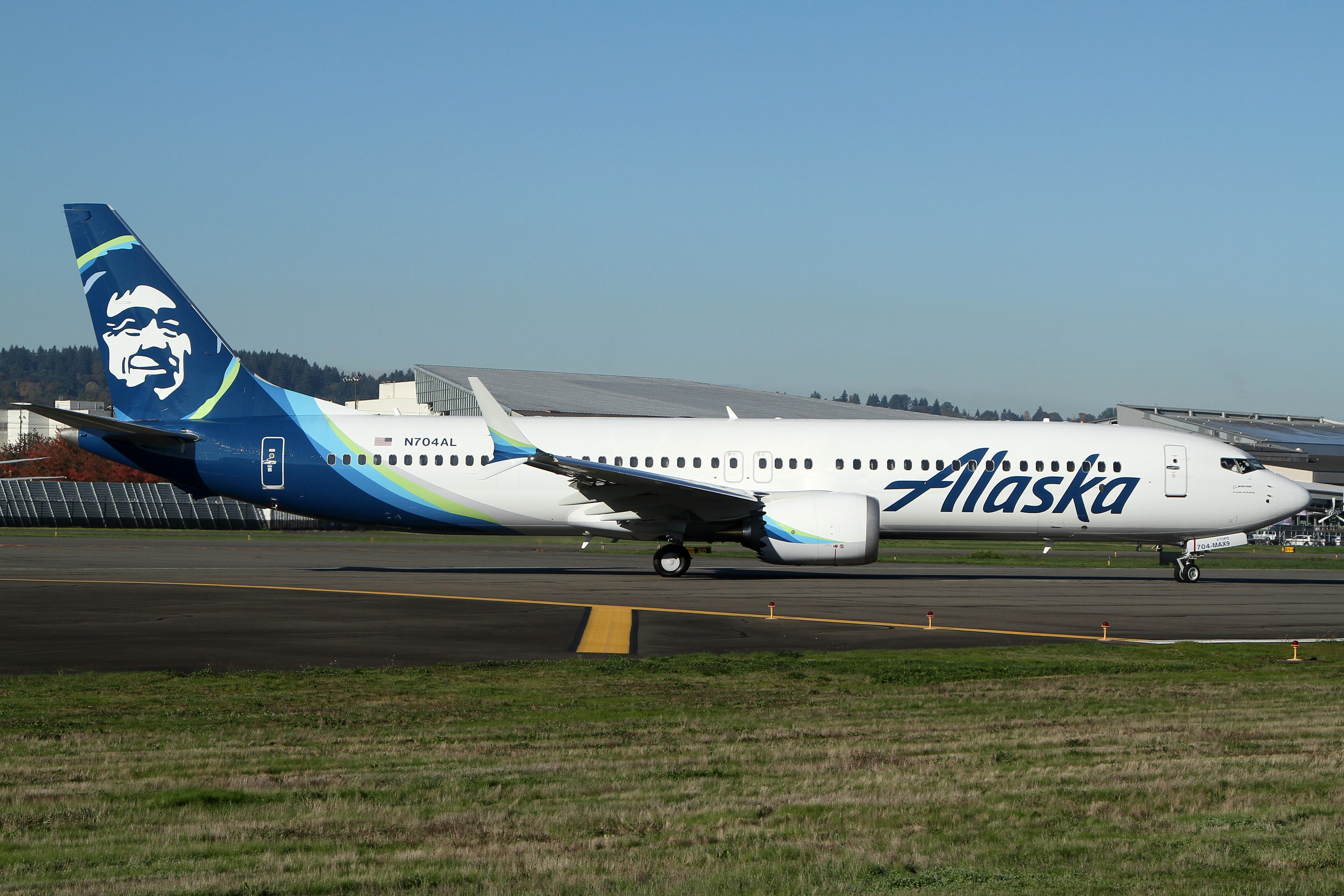
- N704AL, the aircraft involved in the accident, photographed in 2023
- Aircraft type: Boeing 737 MAX 9
- Operator: Alaska Airlines
- IATA flight No.: AS1282
- ICAO flight No.: ASA1282
- Call sign: ALASKA 1282
- Registration: N704AL
- Flight origin: Portland International Airport, Portland, Oregon, U.S.
- Destination: Ontario International Airport, Ontario, California, U.S.
- Occupants: 177
- Passengers: 171
- Crew: 6
- Fatalities: 0
- Injuries: 8
- Survivors: 177

Alaska Airlines Flight 1282 was a scheduled domestic flight operated by Alaska Airlines from Portland International Airport in Portland, Oregon, to Ontario International Airport in Ontario, California. Shortly after takeoff on January 5, 2024, a door plug on the Boeing 737 MAX 9 aircraft blew out, causing an uncontrolled decompression of the aircraft. The aircraft returned to Portland for an emergency landing. All 171 passengers and 6 crew members survived the accident, with 1 flight attendant and 7 passengers receiving minor injuries.

According to a final report released by the National Transportation Safety Board (NTSB), the probable cause of the door plug blowout was a systemic failure of Boeing's manufacturing process and ineffective oversight by the Federal Aviation Administration (FAA). The in-flight separation was caused by four crucial bolts that were never reinstalled after being removed at the factory.

== Aircraft and crew ==
The aircraft involved was a Boeing 737 MAX 9 (typically referred to as model 737-9 in official FAA documents) with manufacturer's serial number 67501, fuselage line number 8789, and registered as N704AL. At the time of the accident the aircraft was around two months old and had logged 510 total flight hours over 154 flights.

737 MAX 9 comparison

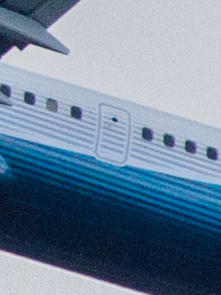
Door installed

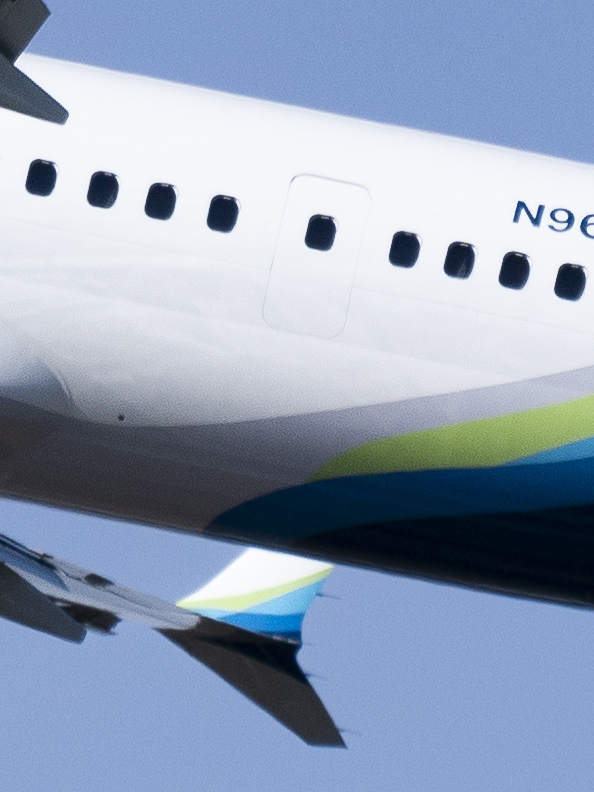
Opening plugged

A comparison of the 737 MAX 9 with and without the rear mid-cabin exit door

The MAX 9 has optional rear mid-cabin emergency exit doors which are located on each side of the aircraft behind the wings. Aircraft configured with greater than 189 seats, such as the MAX 9s operated by Lion Air (220 seats) and Corendon Dutch Airlines (213 seats), require these additional emergency exit doors and slides to meet regulatory requirements for evacuation speed. On aircraft with less dense configurations, such as those operated by Alaska Airlines (178 seats) and United Airlines (179 seats), the doors are not required and plugs are installed in their place. Compared to having the exit door in place, the plug is lighter, offers a full-sized passenger window, and does not have the complexity of a door with its operations and maintenance concerns. On the interior of the aircraft, the plugs are covered with cabin panels no different in appearance from a regular window panel.

The door plug was manufactured by Spirit AeroSystems in Malaysia on March 24, 2023. It arrived at Spirit's factory in Wichita, Kansas, on May 10, where the fuselage was assembled. It was installed on the fuselage before it was shipped by train on August 20 for final assembly at the Boeing Renton Factory in Renton, Washington, where it arrived 11 days later. After the fuselage arrived at the Boeing Renton Factory, five damaged rivets were found on the fuselage near the door plugs. The plug was removed so that Spirit AeroSystems employees could fix the rivets. Once the repair was made, the plug was reinstalled, but not bolted into place.

Diagram of the Boeing Max 9 Door plug. Created with reference to the NTSB Report.

From November 27 to December 7, the aircraft was under modification by AAR Corp at a facility in Oklahoma City to install a satellite antenna for in-flight internet service atop the rear fuselage, in the vicinity of the door plugs. AAR stated on January 8 that they did not perform any work involving the plugs themselves.

The captain was 48-year-old Brandon Fisher, who had joined Alaska Airlines in 2007 and flew as a 737 first officer for 11 years before being upgraded to captain in 2018. He had logged 12,700 flight hours, including 6,500 hours on the Boeing 737 and 304 hours on the 737 MAX 9. The first officer was 36-year-old Emily Wiprud, who had joined Alaska Airlines in 2017 and had 8,300 flight hours, with 1,500 of them on the Boeing 737 and 311 of them on the Boeing 737 MAX 9. She was also type rated on the Airbus A320 family, Bombardier CRJ, Embraer ERJ family, and Cessna Citation aircraft. Both pilots had received hands-on oxygen mask training in 2023. There were four flight attendants on board, all of whom had been trained on the Boeing 737 MAX 9 in 2019. Each had their last recurrent training in 2023.

As of June 28, 2024, Alaska returned the accident aircraft to Boeing, which is listed as the owner on the formalized aircraft registration, while awaiting delivery of a MAX 10 aircraft.

== Accident ==
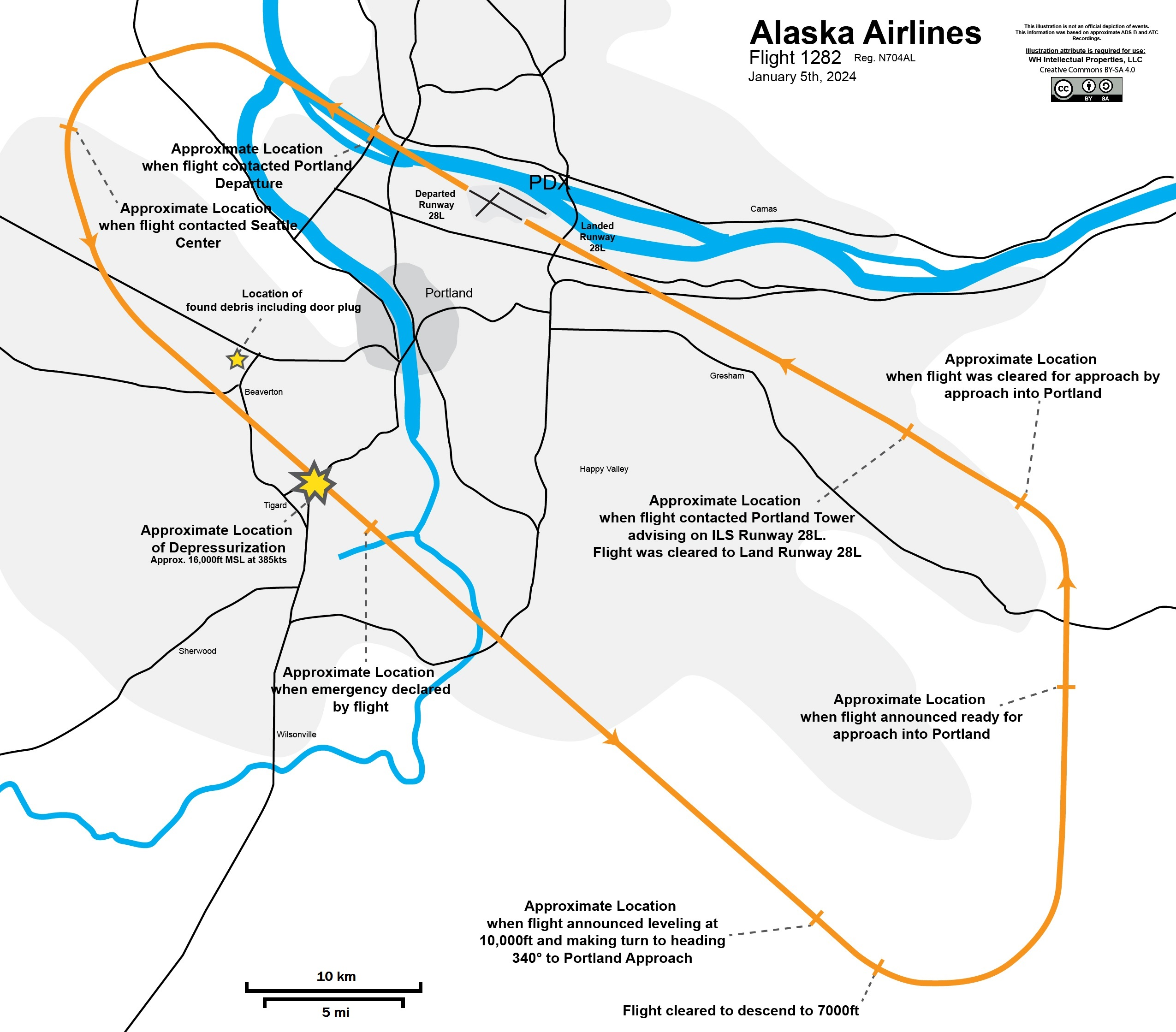
Flight path illustration of Alaska Airlines Flight 1282

Flight 1282 took off from Portland International Airport on January 5, 2024, at 5:07 p.m. Pacific Standard Time (PST). Six crew members and 171 passengers were aboard the flight.

Approximately six and a half minutes after takeoff, the factory-installed door plug filling the port-side opening for the optional emergency exit door separated from the airframe, causing an uncontrolled decompression of the aircraft. The aircraft's oxygen masks deployed during the accident. No one was in seat 26A, which was immediately next to the hole. Three passengers experienced minor injuries that required medical attention, and some passengers' items were lost when the items were blown out of the opening.

External image
- "Diagram of a Boeing 737-9 mid-cabin door plug and components" (Source: NTSB Twitter)

A teenage boy seated in row 25 had his shirt ripped off and blown out of the aircraft; his mother said that she had to hold onto him to prevent him being blown out during the decompression. Passengers reported hearing a loud bang followed by the oxygen masks deploying and a large, loud gust of wind. One passenger said that others closer to the opening in the plane were able to move to other seats further away.

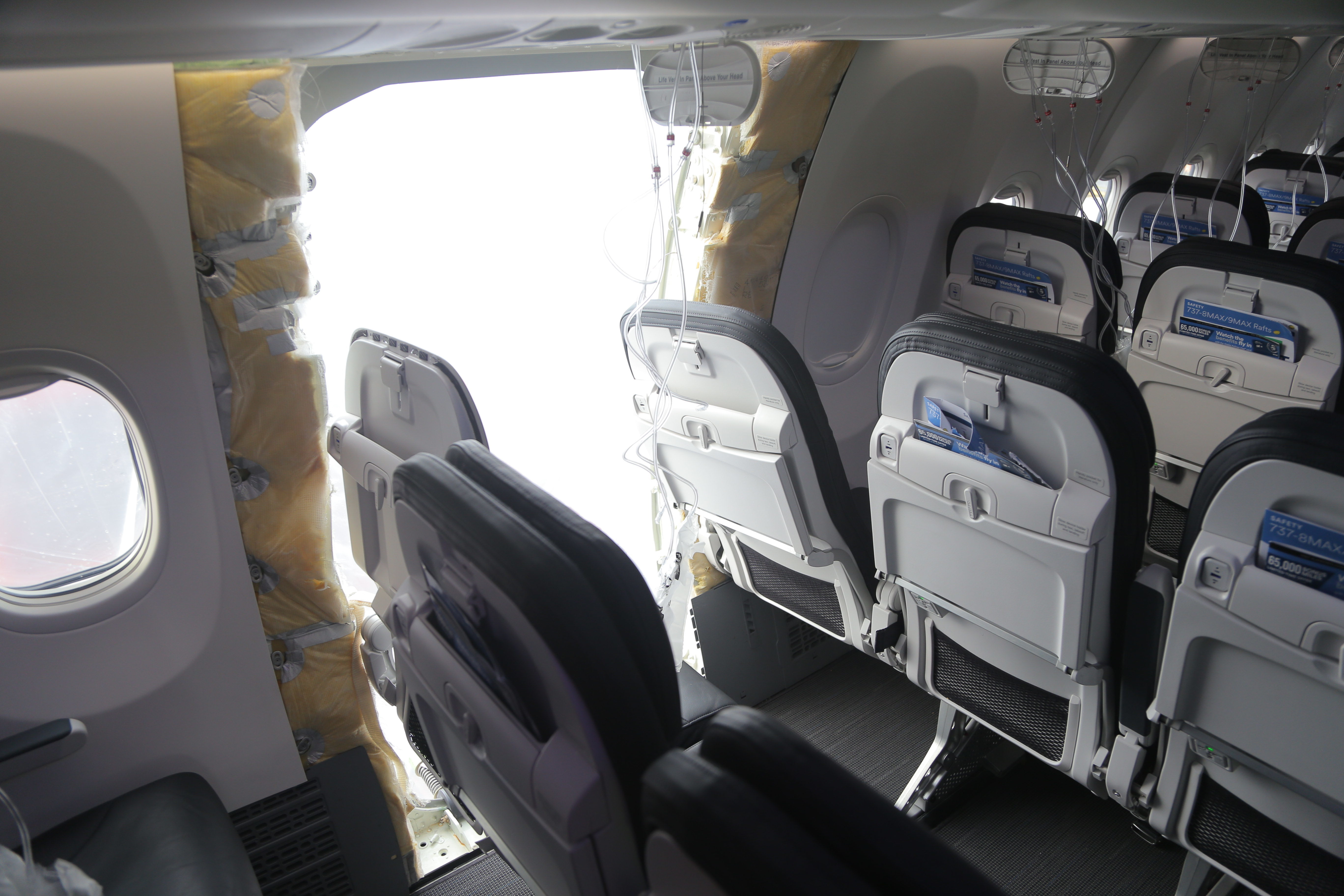
Interior view from after the accident showing the missing door plug and damaged seats

The decompression event caused the cockpit door to fly open and hit the lavatory door, which initially became stuck. After several attempts, a flight attendant was able to close the cockpit door. The cockpit door is designed to open in the event of an uncontrolled decompression, but the crew was not aware of this. The laminated Quick Reference Checklist stowed below the cockpit windows was blown into the cabin. The first officer's headset was pulled off, and the captain's was dislodged.

Interior non-structural damage was observed at rows 1 through 4, 11 and 12, 25 through 27, and 31 through 33, including damage to seat 25A, which lost its headrest and was itself twisted, and seat 26A, which lost its headrest and seatback cushion as well as the tray table on its rear side.

According to flight trackers, the aircraft had climbed to about 16,000 feet (4,900 m) when the accident occurred. The pilots made an emergency descent to 10,000 feet (3,000 m) and returned to Portland, where they successfully made an emergency landing at 5:27 pm. Firefighters boarded the aircraft to check for injuries among the passengers.

=== Flight data recorder timeline ===
At a media briefing on January 8, the NTSB provided the following timeline of key events obtained from the flight data recorder.

All times are in PST and occurred on January 5, 2024.

- 5:06:47 pm – Aircraft departs Portland International Airport (PDX) from runway 28L
- 5:12:33 pm – While passing 14,830 feet (4,520 m), recorded cabin pressure drops from 14.09 to 11.64 psi (97.1 to 80.3 kPa); "cabin altitude >10,000 feet warning" activates, indicating that the cabin is underpressurized at an altitude greater than 10,000 feet (3,048 m) above sea level; pressurization or supplemental oxygen is necessary above that altitude
- 5:12:34 pm – Master caution activates; cabin pressure continues to drop, recorded at 9.08 psi (62.6 kPa)
- 5:12:52 pm – Master caution deactivated by crew
- 5:13:41 pm – Aircraft reaches a maximum altitude of 16,320 feet (4,974 m) and begins to descend
- 5:13:56 pm – Autopilot selected altitude changes from 23,000 to 10,000 feet (7,010 to 3,048 m)
- 5:14:35 pm – Master caution activates again for three seconds
- 5:16:56 pm – Aircraft begins a left turn, heading north back to PDX
- 5:17:00 pm – Aircraft descends below 10,000 feet (3,048 m)
- 5:18:05 pm – While passing 9,050 feet (2,758 m), "cabin altitude >10,000 feet warning" deactivates; cabin pressure recorded at 10.48 psi (72.3 kPa)
- 5:26:46 pm – Aircraft lands back on runway 28L at PDX

== Aftermath ==
Alaska Airlines initially grounded their 65 737 MAX 9 aircraft in the hours after the accident on January 5. The airline later said that 18 aircraft were ready to return to service on January 6 after determining that those 737 MAX 9s had already had their door plugs inspected "as part of a recent heavy maintenance visit". However, later in the day, on January 6, the Federal Aviation Administration (FAA) issued an Emergency Airworthiness Directive (EAD) that grounded all Boeing 737 MAX 9 aircraft with a mid-cabin door plug installed, pending a required inspection and corrective actions where required. Alaska Airlines subsequently removed the 18 aircraft from service following the EAD. The EAD also impacted the United Airlines and Copa Airlines, which operate the MAX 9 in the United States. Turkish Airlines and Lion Air also grounded their fleets for inspection. On January 7, the European Union Aviation Safety Agency (EASA) adopted the FAA's EAD, though it stated that no airline in its jurisdiction currently operated any MAX 9 aircraft with the door plug configuration.

The cabin door plug was discovered in the backyard of a home in the Cedar Mill area, near Oregon Route 217. It was reported to the NTSB on January 7. Two mobile phones from the flight had also been found by members of the public, one in a backyard and the other by a road.

On January 11, six passengers filed a class action lawsuit against Boeing, citing injuries to passengers and emotional trauma.

On January 12, Alaska Airlines announced further cancellations through Tuesday, January 16, equating to between 110 and 150 flights per day. On January 17, Alaska Airlines announced that their maintenance and engineering technicians had completed preliminary inspections of "a group of [their] 737-9 MAX" planes as requested by the FAA and had provided the data to Boeing and FAA for further analysis and consultation. Flight cancellations were extended to Sunday, January 21.

On January 21, the FAA recommended inspections of door plugs on the Boeing 737-900ER, an earlier non-MAX 737 version that uses the same type of door as the accident airplane. The FAA said inspections should "ensure the door is properly secured." The agency said some operators doing inspections on those aircraft "noted findings with bolts during the maintenance inspections." The FAA said the 737-900ER has 11 million hours of operation and has not had problems with its door plugs. In the United States, Alaska, Delta, and United fly the 737-900ER.

On January 24, the FAA approved a new inspection process and cleared all 737 MAX 9 aircraft with door plugs to return to service when the inspection is completed successfully for each plane. Alaska Airlines and United Airlines began returning their 737 MAX 9 planes to service on January 26 and 27, respectively.

Alaska Air Group reported in April 2024 that Boeing had paid about US$160 million as initial compensation to address the hit from the temporary grounding of 737 MAX 9 jets. The compensation package also included allowing Alaska to return the aircraft involved to Boeing, reducing storage and maintenance costs for the airline. Across all MAX 9 customers, Boeing agreed to pay a total of US$443 million to compensate them for losses during the grounding. To bring 737 fuselage construction back in-house, Boeing announced on June 30 that it would buy back Spirit AeroSystems in a US$4.7 billion deal that was signed in late 2025.

== Investigation ==
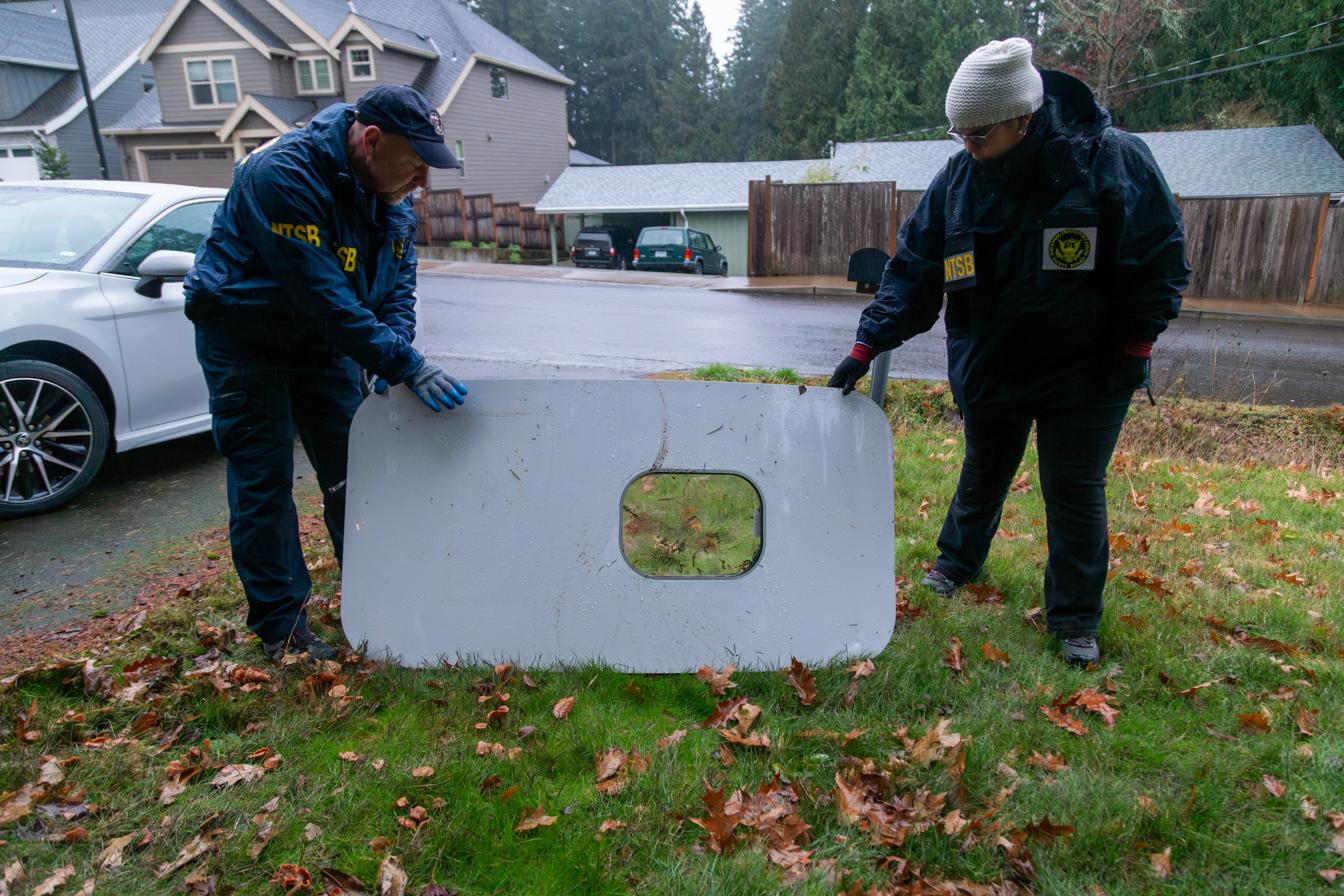
NTSB investigators with the door plug recovered from the backyard of a home in Cedar Mill, Oregon

The National Transportation Safety Board (NTSB) conducted an investigation into the accident, led by NTSB Chair Jennifer Homendy. The FAA, Alaska Airlines, the Air Line Pilots Association (the union representing Alaska pilots), the Association of Flight Attendants (the union representing Alaska flight attendants), Boeing, Spirit AeroSystems, and the International Association of Machinists and Aerospace Workers (the union representing Boeing and Spirit AeroSystems workers) provided support as members of the investigation party. The United States Department of Justice (DOJ) and Federal Bureau of Investigation (FBI) have also opened separate criminal investigations into the accident.

The aircraft involved in the accident had its cabin pressurization "AUTO FAIL" indicator illuminated on three previous occasions – on December 7, January 3 (in flight), and January 4 (after landing). This indicates that the primary automatic cabin pressurization controller was disabled by a fault condition, which can be caused by a problem with the controller itself, one of the valves it controls, an excessive pressure differential, an excessive rate of cabin pressure change, or a high cabin altitude. When a fault is detected, pressurization control automatically transfers to an alternate automatic controller. The "AUTO FAIL" indicator alerts the crew to this change, but no intervention is prescribed. On each occasion of a fault, the alternate controller was used, and flights proceeded normally. However, due to the faults, Alaska Airlines had restricted the aircraft from operating extended overwater flights (under ETOPS rules) until a detailed maintenance inspection could occur. The NTSB concluded that this indicator was not related to the accident.

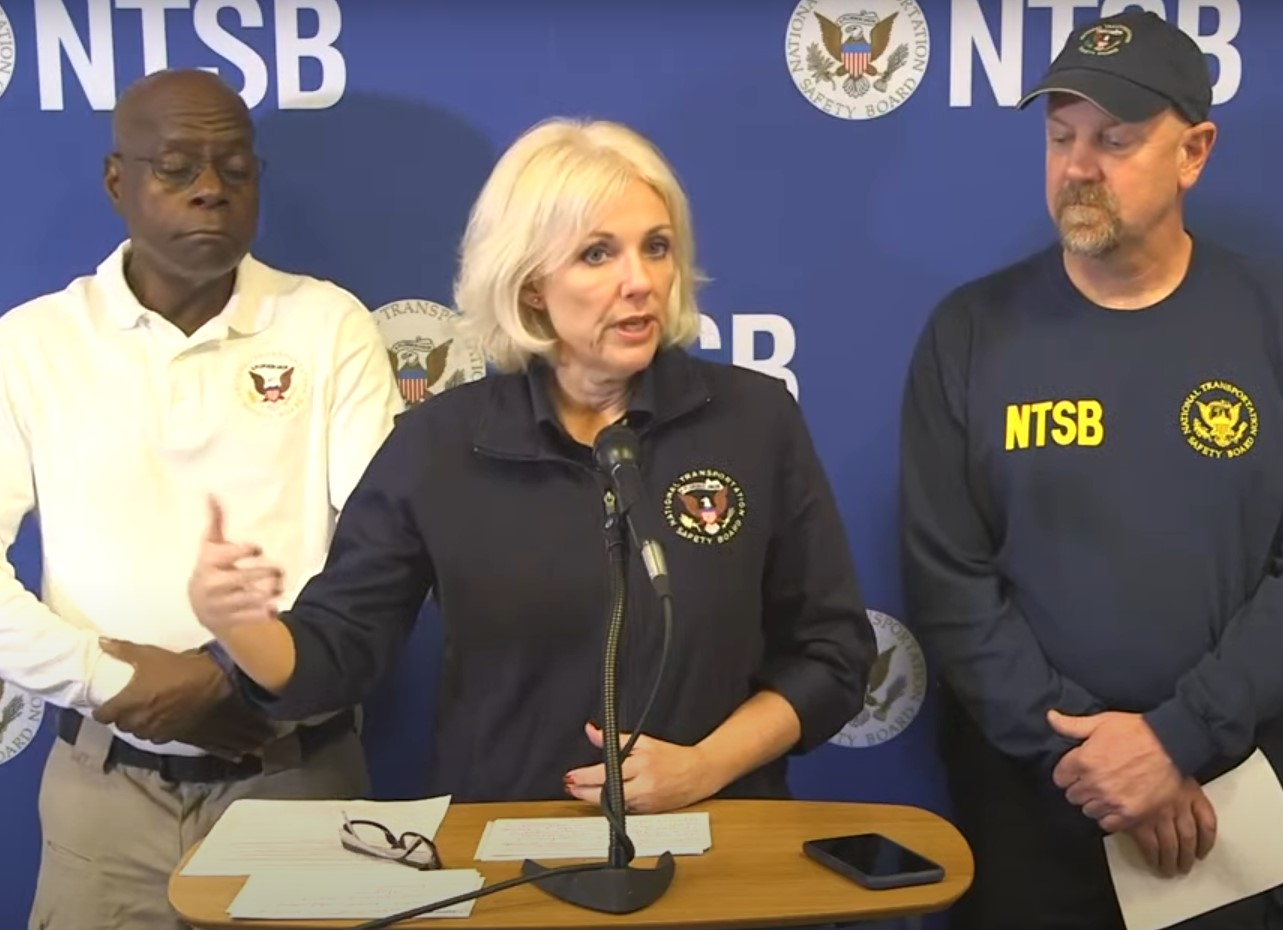
January 8, 2024: NTSB Chair Jennifer Homendy briefing the media in Portland, Oregon, on the NTSB investigation involving Alaska Airlines Flight 1282

The cockpit voice recorder (CVR) was overwritten after the accident. The CVR on the aircraft records a two-hour loop, and the circuit breaker in the cockpit was not pulled to stop the recording after the aircraft landed. NTSB chair Jennifer Homendy subsequently called for extending capacity to 25 hours, rather than the currently mandated two hours, on all new and existing aircraft. If implemented, the new rule will align with International Civil Aviation Organization (ICAO) and European Union Aviation Safety Agency's (EASA) current regulations.

On January 8, United Airlines stated they had found loose bolts during inspections on an undisclosed number of grounded aircraft. Alaska Airlines also announced their inspections had found loose bolts on "many" aircraft.

On January 9, Boeing's president and CEO, Dave Calhoun, acknowledged the company's mistake in a company-wide meeting on safety and transparency following this accident. The company pledged full transparency and cooperation in the investigation with the NTSB and FAA. In an interview with CNBC on January 10, Dave Calhoun described it as a quality control issue and said that a "quality escape" had occurred. Also on January 10, the FAA notified Boeing that it was under investigation for "alleged noncompliance" with regulations relating to new aircraft inspection and testing.

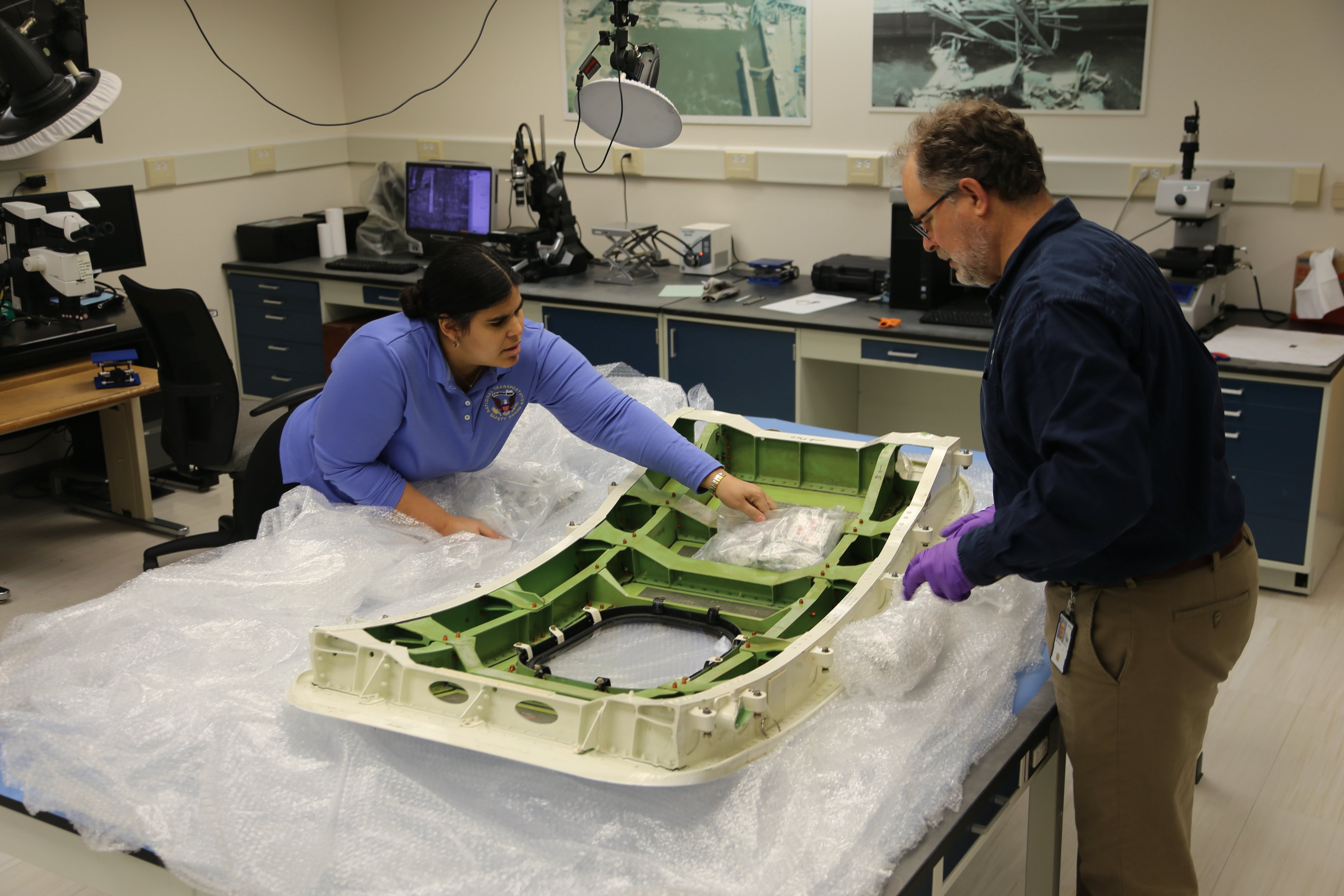
NTSB staff examine the door plug in the NTSB materials laboratory

The NTSB's initial assessment found that the stop pads and fittings of the door plug and frame were intact, and that the plug had moved upwards to clear the pads to enable its ejection from the aircraft. The upper guide fittings on the door plug were found to be fractured. Investigation on the status of the retention bolts designed to prevent the door plug from moving upwards was ongoing. By design, four retention bolts should be present; Homendy said the bolts were not on the door plug when it was found. She said investigators were trying to determine if the bolts were never installed or if they were torn off when the door plug blew out. The NTSB also examined witness marks using microscopes and other scientific equipment.

On January 15, in a message to employees, Boeing Commercial Airplanes President and CEO Stan Deal announced "immediate" actions the company was taking to bolster quality assurance and controls in 737 production: planning more quality inspections, planning more team sessions on quality, Boeing review of Spirit AeroSystems work, airline oversight inspections and independent assessment by outside party on Boeing's quality management system. These actions were separate from the FAA's investigation and the agency's plan to increase oversight of 737–9 production.

The NTSB released a preliminary report on the accident on February 6, which said that the damage patterns on the door plug indicated that the four bolts, intended to secure the door plug, had been missing when the accident occurred. They also reviewed Boeing records that showed evidence that the plug had been installed with no bolts.

The NTSB held an investigative hearing on the accident on August 6–7. On March 13, NTSB chairman Homendy stated in a letter to Congress that security footage of the aircraft's door plug installation back in September had been overwritten. Boeing responded that this was standard practice.

After Boeing revealed privileged information about the investigation to journalists during a meeting on June 25, along with analysis of the facts, the NTSB stopped sharing information with the company.

The NTSB released their investigation docket and held a public hearing on August 6. A second hearing on June 24, 2025, found that the probable cause of the accident was the blowout of the door plug, attributing this to Boeing's failure to adequately oversee its factory workers.

== See also ==
- Boeing manufacturing and design issues
- John Barnett (whistleblower)
- List of accidents and incidents involving the Boeing 737
- Similar accidents and incidents:
  - British Airways Flight 5390 (windscreen failure due to use of undersized bolts leading to uncontrolled decompression, two injuries), 1990
  - American Airlines Flight 96 (cargo door failure due to design flaw leading to uncontrolled decompression, eleven injuries), 1972
  - Turkish Airlines Flight 981 (cargo door failure due to design flaw leading to uncontrolled decompression, all 346 aboard killed), 1974
  - United Airlines Flight 811 (cargo door failure due to design flaw leading to uncontrolled decompression, nine passengers ejected and killed), 1989
  - Sichuan Airlines Flight 8633 (windscreen failure due to a leaking seal leading to uncontrolled decompression, two injuries), 2018
