= Evergreen International Airlines Flight 17 =

1989 aviation accident

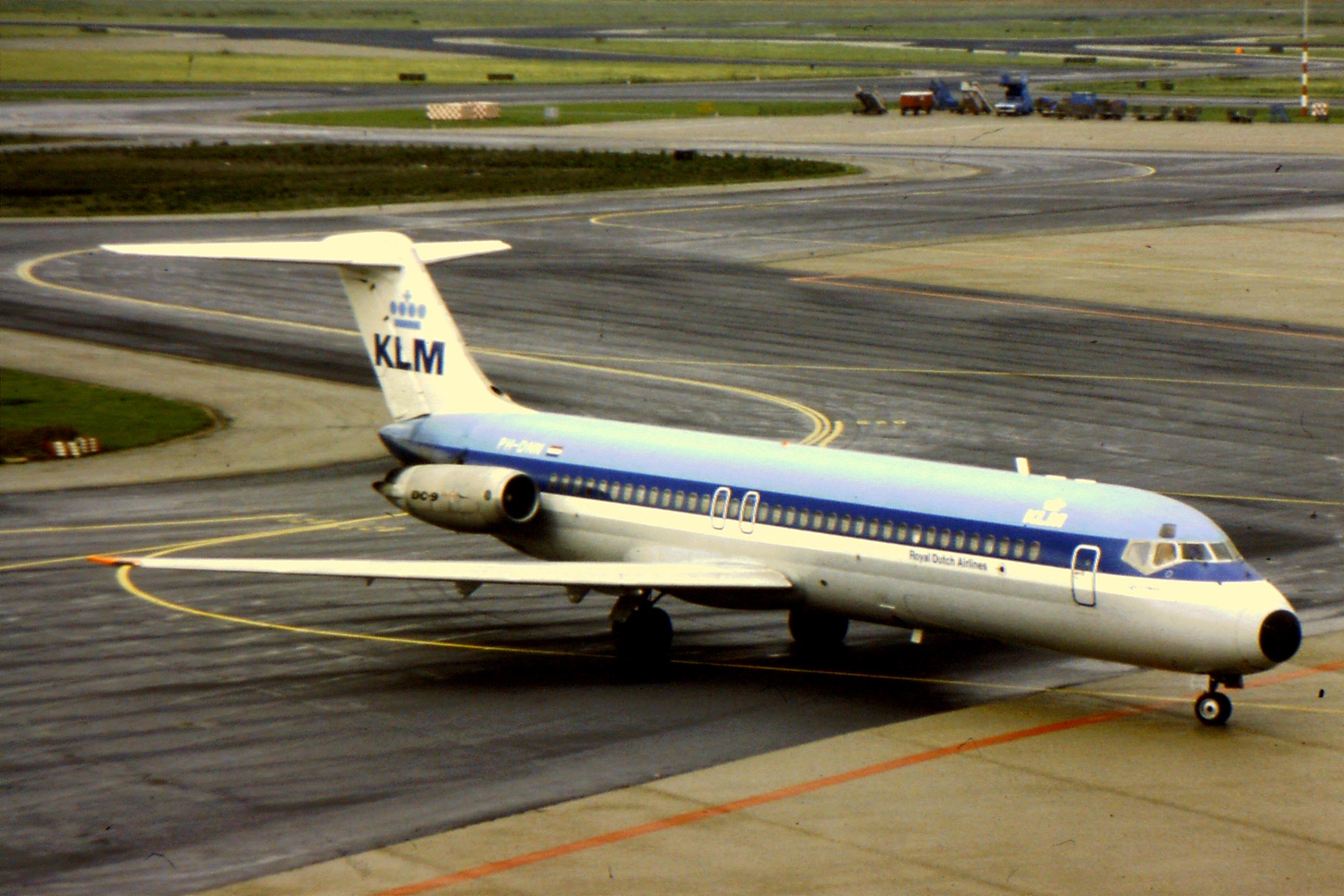
- The aircraft involved in the accident, while still in service with KLM in 1985

Accident
- Date: March 18, 1989
- Summary: Loss of control following cargo door failure
- Site: Saginaw, Texas, United States; 32°54′39″N 97°24′45″W

Aircraft
- Aircraft type: McDonnell Douglas DC-9-33F
- Operator: Evergreen International Airlines
- IATA flight No.: 4U17
- ICAO flight No.: EIA17
- Call sign: LOGAIR 931
- Registration: N931F
- Flight origin: Kelly Field, San Antonio, Texas
- Stopover: Carswell Air Force Base, Fort Worth, Texas
- Destination: Tinker Air Force Base, Oklahoma County, Oklahoma
- Occupants: 2
- Crew: 2
- Fatalities: 2
- Survivors: 0

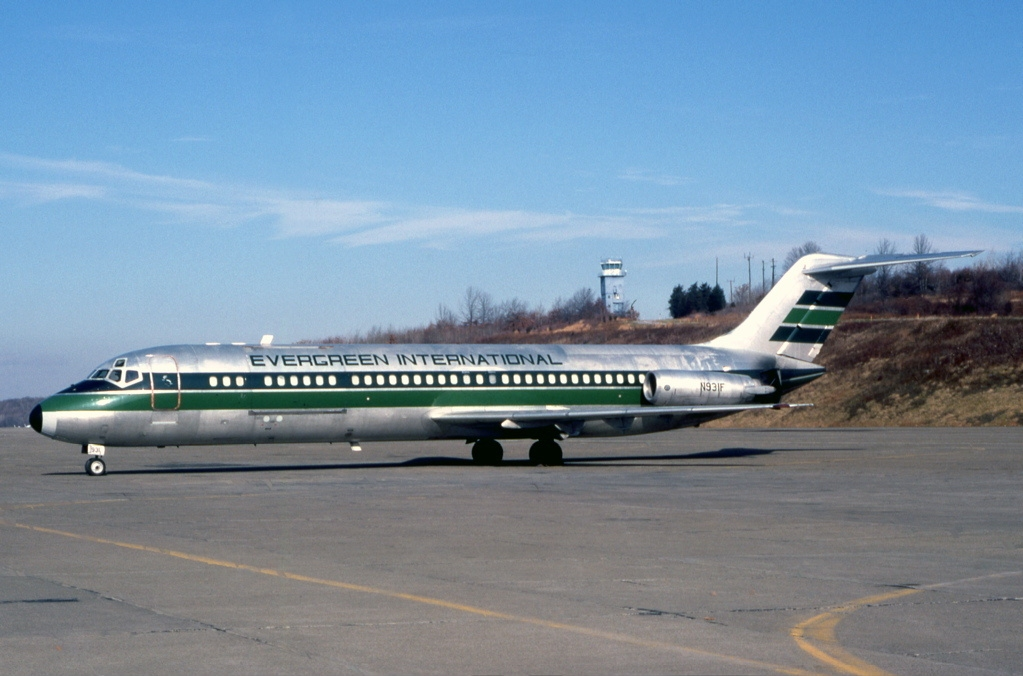
An Evergreen DC-9, similar to the aircraft involved in the accident (Note: There were 2 Evergreen DC-9's that had the registration N931F. This aircraft, pictured here in December 1988, went on to fly for Airborne Express under the registration N904AX.)

Evergreen International Airlines Flight 17 (4U17/EIA17) was a McDonnell Douglas DC-9 cargo flight operated by Evergreen International Airlines on behalf of the Air Force Logair program. On March 18, 1989, the flight's planned route was scheduled to take it from Kelly Air Force Base (outside San Antonio, Texas) to Tinker Air Force Base (outside of Oklahoma City, Oklahoma), with a stop at Carswell Air Force Base in Fort Worth, Texas. The two pilots were the only occupants on board. Shortly after taking off from Carswell, the aircraft's main cargo door opened, the crew lost control of the aircraft, and it subsequently crashed while attempting an emergency landing, killing both pilots.

== Aircraft and crew ==
The aircraft involved, manufactured in 1968, was a McDonnell Douglas DC-9-33F registered as N931F with serial number 41792 and line number 287. It was delivered to KLM in a dual passenger-cargo configuration. It was later converted into a passenger-only aircraft in 1984. In 1987, the aircraft was reconfigured into a freighter, where it was later delivered to Evergreen International Airlines in the same year.

The captain was 41-year-old Gerald Jack McCall, who had been with Evergreen International Airlines since 1984. He had a total of 7,238 hours of flight experience, including 1,938 hours on the DC-9. He was also a check airman on that aircraft. Other pilots who had flown with captain McCall described him as having a habit of checking the cargo door warning lights before takeoff. The first officer was 39-year-old Thomas Bill Johnston, who had 10,863 flight hours, with 1,213 of them on the DC-9. He was also type rated on Learjet aircraft.

== History of the flight ==
=== Preparation ===
Flight 17 was carrying equipment for the United States Air Force on behalf of Logair, the Air Force's domestic air freight program, including 12 pounds (5.4 kg) of explosives.

On the day of the accident, the aircraft took off from Tinker Air Force Base in Oklahoma, stopping at Dyess Air Force Base, Kelly Field Annex, then, Fort Worth Carswell Air Force Base in Texas. The flight would then return to Tinker Air Force Base. After landing at Carswell Air Force Base, Air Force personnel loaded cargo onto the aircraft.

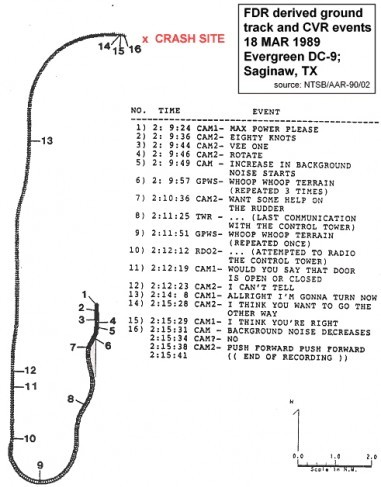
Path of Flight 17

According to the cockpit voice recorder (CVR), captain McCall was the pilot flying. The flight crew calculated the following takeoff speeds:

- V_{1} was 112 knots (207 km/h; 129 mph)
- V_{R} (rotation speed) was 116 knots (215 km/h; 133 mph)
- V_{2} was 125 knots (232 km/h; 144 mph)

At 02:00 central standard time (CST) first officer Johnston left the cockpit to close the main cargo door. He returned two minutes later. The flight crew completed the before start checklist, which included verifying that the cargo door was closed. First officer Johnston told captain McCall "Cargo door's inspected, tail stand...I've removed it, sill guards are onboard."

=== Accident ===
Flight 17 began its takeoff roll from runway 17 at 02:09:13, and lifted off at 02:09:46. At 02:09:49, three seconds after rotation, the main cargo door partially opened, which was indicated by the CVR recording a sudden increase in background noise. The ground proximity warning system (GPWS) activated, sounding a "whoop whoop terrain" four times. First officer Johnston declared an emergency to air traffic control (ATC). The controller asked the crew the nature of the emergency, and first officer Johnston replied, "okay we got a cargo door open." After ATC asked Flight 17 to report on when they were on the downward leg of their emergency final approach, the flight crew developed problems with communication. The flight climbed to 2,500 feet (760 m) and then began a right turn back towards Carswell. During the downwind leg, the main cargo door completely opened, causing the aircraft to yaw and roll uncontrollably. The aircraft then banked to the left, inverted, and crashed into a pasture near Saginaw. The aircraft exploded on impact, killing both pilots.

== Investigation ==
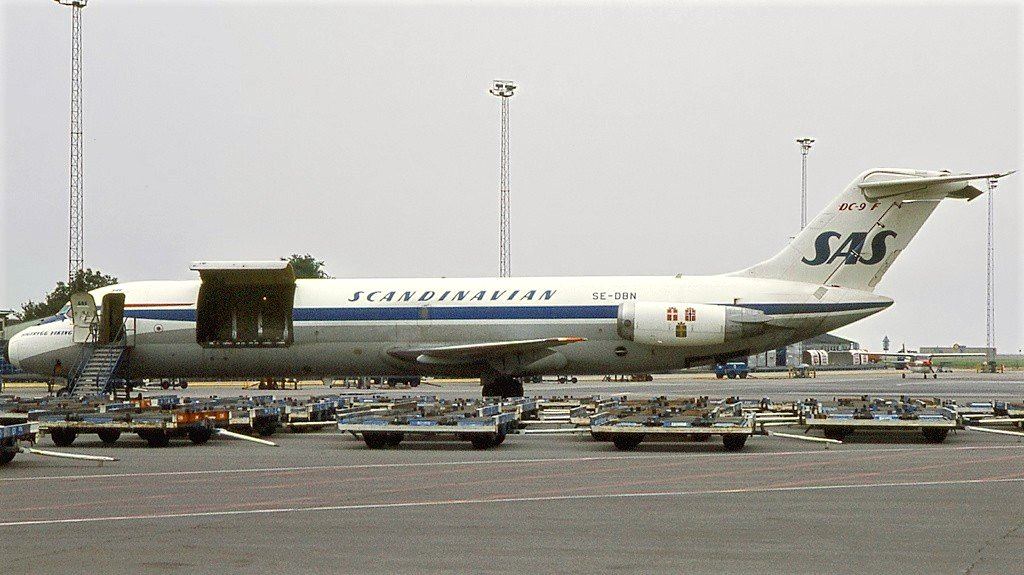
A DC-9-30F with the main cargo door open

During the investigation by National Transportation Safety Board (NTSB), it was discovered that First Officer Johnston did not fully close the cargo door; he held the control valve handle in the closed position for an inadequate period of time. It was not immediately evident that the door was improperly closed because the locked-and-latched indicator labels were incorrectly applied, and the position of the torque tube drive socket fitting—used to double-check that the door was latched—was difficult to see at night because the fitting was a similar shade of green as the aircraft. Additionally, a design flaw in the cargo door warning light circuit caused the door-open warning light in the cockpit not to illuminate. The NTSB found that the door lockpin switch in N931F was damaged and corroded, and the warning light circuit was designed in such a way that if the switch failed, the warning light would stop working. McDonnell Douglas (MDD) had redesigned the circuit to render it fail-safe and had issued a service bulletin in 1976, but the modification was not mandatory, and the NTSB faulted the Federal Aviation Administration (FAA) for not issuing an airworthiness directive (AD) mandating that the improved circuit be installed in all DC-9s with cargo doors.

The NTSB concluded that the accident was caused by the main cargo door having opened, and the subsequent loss of control of the aircraft. The reason for the loss of control alone could not be determined because the simulator and wind tunnel tests were unable to verify aerodynamic movements caused by the cargo door separation and captain McCall's attempt to correct them. Evergreen International's inadequate procedures for securing the cargo door, the failure of MD to provide emergency procedures for cargo doors opening mid-flight, and the failure of the FAA to issue an AD for the warning light circuit were contributing factors in the accident.

== See also ==
- Alaska Airlines Flight 1282
- Tropical Airways Flight 1301
