= American Airlines Flight 96 =

1972 aviation accident over Canada

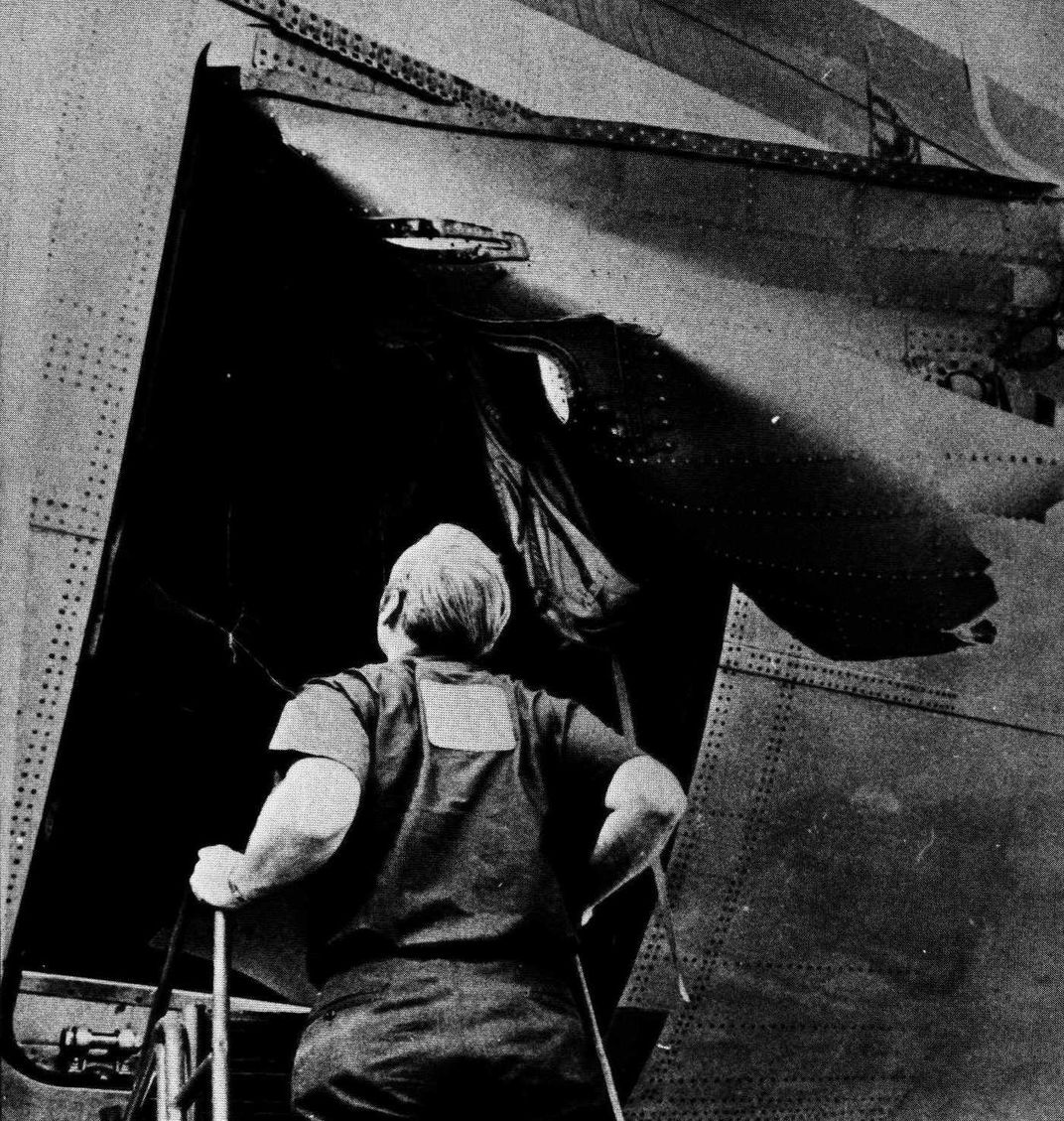
- The exterior skin of the cargo door, left behind on the hinges when the door was ripped off

Accident
- Date: June 12, 1972
- Summary: Cargo door failure due to design flaw leading to rapid decompression; subsequent emergency landing
- Site: Airspace above Windsor, Ontario

Aircraft
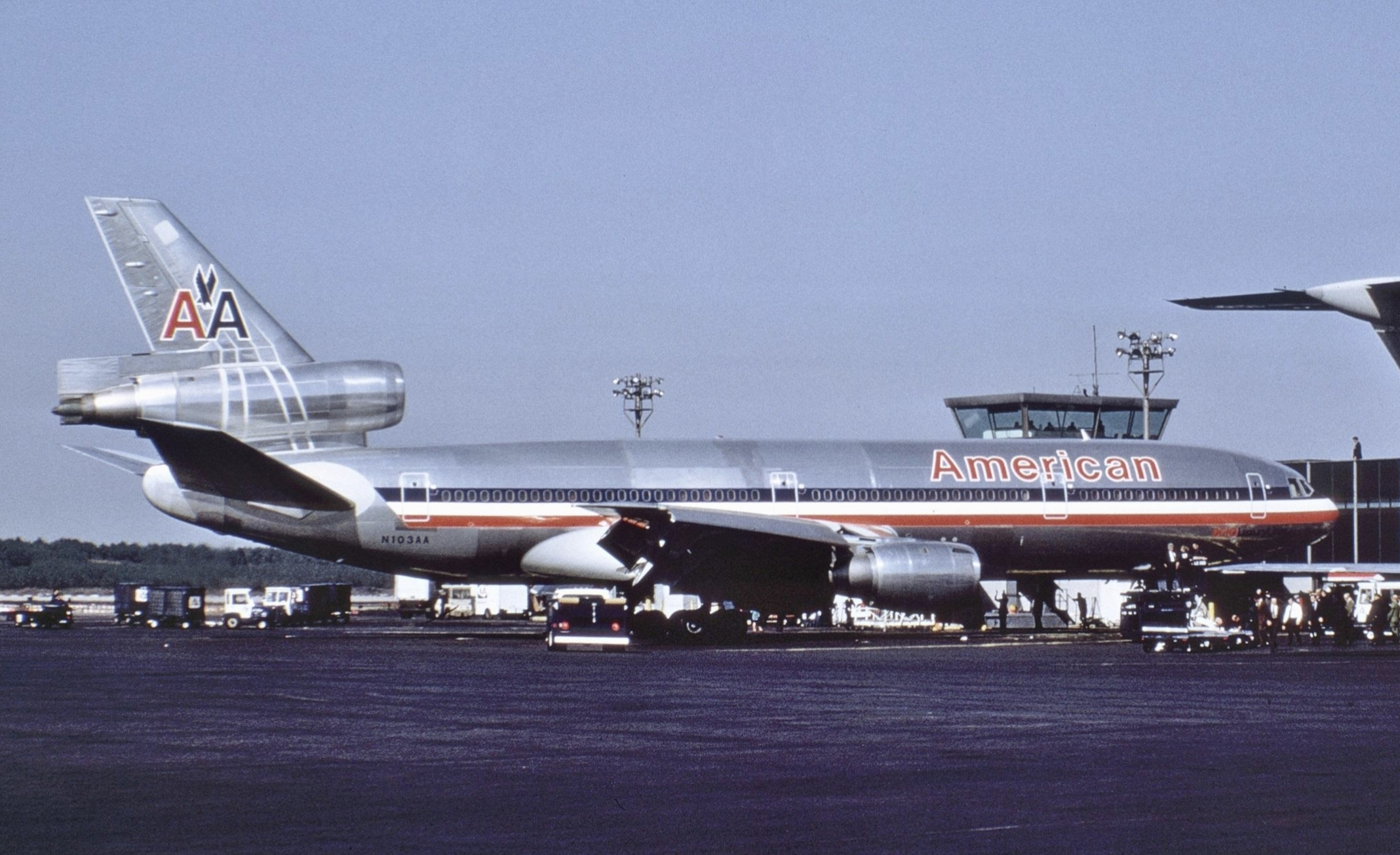
- N103AA, the aircraft involved in the accident, seen in 1971
- Aircraft type: McDonnell Douglas DC-10-10
- Operator: American Airlines
- IATA flight No.: AA96
- ICAO flight No.: AAL96
- Call sign: AMERICAN 96
- Registration: N103AA
- Flight origin: Los Angeles International Airport, Los Angeles, California, U.S.
- Stopover: Detroit Metropolitan Airport, Detroit, Michigan, U.S.
- Last stopover: Buffalo Niagara International Airport, Buffalo, New York, U.S.
- Destination: LaGuardia Airport, Queens, New York City, New York, U.S.
- Occupants: 67
- Passengers: 56
- Crew: 11
- Fatalities: 0
- Injuries: 11
- Survivors: 67

American Airlines Flight 96 was a regular domestic flight operated by American Airlines from Los Angeles to New York via Detroit and Buffalo. On June 12, 1972, after takeoff from Detroit, Michigan, the left rear cargo door of the McDonnell Douglas DC-10 operating the flight blew open and broke off above Windsor, Ontario. The accident is thus sometimes referred to as the Windsor incident, although according to the National Transportation Safety Board (NTSB) it was technically an accident, not an incident.

The rapid decompression in the cargo hold caused a partial collapse of the passenger compartment floor, which in turn jammed or restricted some of the control cables which were connected to various flight control hydraulic actuators. The jamming of the rudder control cable caused the rudder to deflect to its maximum right position. The control cables to the number two engine in the tail were severed, causing that engine to shut down. There was no rupture of any hydraulic system, so the pilots still had control of the ailerons, the right elevator, and the horizontal stabilizer. Because the right elevator cable was partially restricted, however, both pilots had to apply back pressure on the yoke for the landing flare. Additionally, the approach and landing had to be made at a higher speed to prevent the sink rate from becoming excessive. The tendency to turn right was offset by using 45 degrees of left aileron, combined with asymmetric thrust of the two wing engines. In spite of the partial restriction of the controls, the pilots managed to return to Detroit Metropolitan Airport and land safely, with no major injuries. The aircraft was repaired and returned to service until 1993.

The cause was traced to the cargo door latching system, which had failed to close and latch the door completely without any indication to the crew that it was not safely closed. A separate locking system was supposed to ensure this could not happen but proved to be inadequate. McDonnell Douglas instituted a number of minor changes to the system in an attempt to avoid a repeat. These were unsuccessful. On March 3, 1974, the rear cargo door of Turkish Airlines Flight 981 experienced the same failure and blew open, causing the aircraft to lose all control and crash in a forest near Paris, France. This crash killed all 346 people on board.

== Aircraft ==
The aircraft involved in the accident was a McDonnell Douglas DC-10-10, registered as N103AA. It was equipped with three General Electric CF6-6D engines.

== Accident details ==
Flight 96 was a regularly scheduled flight from Los Angeles International Airport to LaGuardia Airport with intermediate stops at Detroit Metropolitan Airport and Buffalo Niagara International Airport. On June 12, it was being flown by a DC-10-10, registration N103AA, with a flight crew consisting of Captain Bryce McCormick (age 52), First Officer Peter "Page" Whitney (34), and Flight Engineer Clayton Burke (50). McCormick was a highly experienced pilot, having amassed more than 24,000 flight hours throughout his flying career. Whitney and Burke were also seasoned airmen with approximately 7,900 flight hours and 13,900 flight hours, respectively. Among them, the crew had accumulated 176 hours of flight time in the DC-10.

The flight left Los Angeles 46 minutes after its scheduled 1:30 pm departure due to passenger loading and traffic, and arrived in Detroit at 6:36 pm. In Detroit, the majority of the passengers disembarked, and the aircraft took on new passengers and cargo. Leaving Detroit, the aircraft had 56 passengers and 11 crew. The aircraft departed at 7:20 pm, climbing to 6,000 ft (1,800 m) for a hold, before capturing V-554 (a victor airway) and climbing to FL210 (21,000 ft (6,400 m)).

At 7:25 pm, while climbing through 11,750 ft (3,600 m), at 260 knots (480 km/h; 300 mph), the crew heard a distinct "thud" and dirt in the cockpit flew up into their faces. The "thud" was the sound of the rearmost cargo door breaking off, causing a sudden decompression that also caused part of the floor at the rear of the cabin to partially give way. Captain McCormick momentarily believed they had suffered a mid-air collision and the cockpit windows had been smashed. At the same time, the rudder pedals moved to their full-right position and the engine controls moved to idle. McCormick immediately took manual control of the aircraft and attempted to re-apply power, finding that engines 1 and 3 would respond normally, but engine 2, in the tail, would not allow its controls to be moved, as control cables had been severed when the floor gave way. McCormick managed to level off and stabilize the speed at 250 knots (460 km/h; 290 mph), although at this speed control was very sluggish. They declared an emergency and requested routing back to Detroit.

During the decompression, a sizeable quantity of the cargo stored in the hold was sucked through the now open cargo door and ejected from the DC-10; this included a 6 ft (2 m) long casket with a body inside, which was being transported to Buffalo.

In the cabin, the flight attendants saw a "fog" form within the cabin and immediately recognized it as a depressurization. Two crews were in the rear lounge area, and the floor under their feet partially collapsed into the cargo hold, giving them both minor injuries. In spite of this, the cabin crew immediately attempted to ensure the oxygen masks had deployed properly, but having occurred below the 14,000 ft (4,300 m) limit, the masks had not deployed. One of the attendants obtained a walk-around oxygen bottle and called the cockpit on the intercom to inform them that the damage was in the rear of the aircraft. On instructions from the cockpit, the attendants instructed the passengers on emergency landing procedures. A number of passengers later reported that the aircraft safety cards proved useful in locating the nearest exit.

The aircraft returned to Detroit, but, when the crew set the flaps to 35 degrees for landing, the aircraft stabilized in a 1,900 ft/min (10 m/s) descent rate that was far too fast for landing. By applying power to the No. 1 and No. 3 engines, McCormick managed to level off the nose and reduce the descent rate to 700 ft/min. At 7:44 pm, the aircraft touched down 1,900 ft (580 m) down runway 03R, immediately veering to the right and eventually leaving the runway surface. First Officer Whitney applied full reverse thrust to the left engine and idled the right one, straightening the aircraft's path, and eventually starting to bring the aircraft back to the runway. The aircraft stopped 880 ft (270 m) from the end of the runway, with the nose and left gear on the runway and the right on the grass beside it. It happened that while training to convert his expertise to flying the DC-10, McCormick had practiced, in a simulator, controlling the plane with the throttles in this fashion, in the worst-case scenario of a hydraulic failure. A similar technique was used on another DC-10 in 1989 following a complete loss of hydraulic pressure on United Airlines Flight 232.

== Investigation ==
The problem that caused the accident was immediately obvious, as the rear cargo door was missing and had caused severe damage to the left horizontal stabilizer as it blew off. Investigators immediately studied the maintenance history and found that on March 3, 1972, three months before the accident, the handlers reported that the door had not latched electrically and had to be closed manually. On May 30, McDonnell Douglas issued Service Bulletin 52–27, DC-10 SC 612, which called for the upgrading of the electrical wiring that drove the latches because "Three operators have reported failure of the electrical latch actuators to latch/unlatch the cargo doors. Latch actuator failure is attributed to an excessive voltage drop reducing the output torque to the actuator. This condition may prevent electrical latching/unlatching of the hooks." The modification was not compulsory, however, and had not been carried out on N103AA, the plane involved in the accident.

Investigators interviewed the ground crew in Detroit and learned that the cargo loader who operated the rear door had found it extremely difficult to close. He stated that he closed the door electrically, and waited for the sound of the actuator motors to stop. When they did, he attempted to operate the locking handle but found it very difficult to close. He managed to get the latch to lock only by applying force with his knee, but he noticed that the vent plug (see below) was not entirely closed. He brought this to the attention of a mechanic, who cleared the flight. The flight engineer reported that the "door ajar" warning light on his panel was not lit at any time during the taxi out or flight.

Examination of the aircraft and the cargo door, which was recovered largely intact in Windsor, demonstrated that the latches had never rotated to their locked position. In their locked position, pressure on the door presses the latches further shut, and no force is transmitted into the actuator system that closes and opens them. With the latches only partially closed, forces on the door were transmitted back into the actuator, eventually overwhelming it at about 6,600 lbf (29 kN). The rapid depressurization when the door broke off caused the floor above it to partially cave in, which pulled the rudder cable to its extension limit and severed several other operating cables.

== Cause of door failure ==
Passenger doors on the DC-10 are of the plug variety, which prevents the doors from opening while the aircraft is pressurized. The cargo door, however, is not. Due to its large area, the cargo door on the DC-10 could not be swung inside the fuselage without taking up a considerable amount of valuable cargo space. Instead, the door swung outward, allowing cargo to be stored directly behind it. The outward-opening door, in theory, allowed it to be "blown open" by the pressure inside the cargo area.

To prevent this, the DC-10 used a "fail-safe" latching system held in place by "over top dead center latches", five C-shaped latches mounted on a common torque shaft that are rotated over fixed latching pins ("spools") fixed to the fuselage. Because of their shape, when the latches are in the proper position, pressure on the door does not place torque on the latches that could cause them to open, and further seats them on the pins. Normally the latches are opened and closed by a screw jack powered by an electric actuator motor.

Because the wiring powering the actuator motor was too small, it was possible for the voltage delivered to the motor to drop too low for it to operate as designed under high loads. In these cases, the motor would stop turning even if the latches had not rotated over the pins. Since the operators listened for the motors to stop as an indication of their complete rotation, a failure in the drive system during operation would erroneously indicate that the door was properly latched.

To ensure this rotation had completed and the latches were in the proper position, the DC-10 cargo door also included a separate locking mechanism. The locks consisting of small pins that were slid horizontally through holes on the back of the latches, between the latch and the frame of the aircraft. When the pins were in place, they mechanically prevented movement back into the open position, so even the actuator motor could no longer open them. If the latches were not in their correct positions, the pins could not enter the holes, and the operating handle on the outside of the door would remain open and visually indicate that there was a problem. Additionally, the handle moved a metal plug into a vent cut in the outer door panel; if the vent was not plugged the door would not retain pressure, eliminating any force on the door. Lastly, there was an indicator light in the cockpit that would remain on if the door was not correctly latched.

In theory, motor failure on the plane could not present a problem because it would fail to close the locking lever. During the investigation, however, a McDonnell Douglas test rig demonstrated that the entire locking pin operating system was too weak, allowing the handle to be forced closed even with the pins out of the locking holes. This occurred on Flight 96, when the handler forced the handle closed with his knee. In spite of the vent not closing completely, neither the handler nor the engineer considered this to be serious. Although the vent door remained partially open, it closed enough to cause it to "blow shut", and thereby allow pressurization of the cargo hold. Although the handle did not seat the pins entirely, the small amount of motion it managed to cause was enough to press on the warning indicator switch, deactivating the cockpit warning light. It was only the combination of all of these failures that allowed the accident to happen. Yet all of these indicators shared a single point of failure: the mechanical weakness of the locking system that allowed the handle to be moved.

The cabin floor failure was also a matter of poor design. All other areas of the cargo holds had holes cut into the cabin floor above the cargo areas. In the case of a pressure loss on either side of the floor, the air would flow through the vents and equalize the pressure, thereby eliminating any force on the floor. Only the rearmost portion of the cabin lacked these holes, and it was that portion that failed. Because control cables ran through the floor for the entire length of the aircraft, a failure at any point on the floor could cut control to the tail section.

== Aftermath ==
The National Transportation Safety Board suggested two changes to the DC-10 to ensure that the Windsor accident would not reoccur: changes to the locking mechanism to ensure it could not be forced closed, as well as vents in the rear cabin floor.

In response, the Federal Aviation Administration, in charge of implementing these recommendations, agreed with McDonnell Douglas that the additional venting would be difficult to install. Instead, they proceeded with the modification of the locking system and additionally added a small clear window set into the bottom of the cargo door that allowed operators to directly inspect whether or not the latches were in place. Combined with the upgrades to the wiring that had already been on the books, this was expected to prevent a repeat of the accident.

Shortly after the event, Dan Applegate, Director of Product Engineering at Convair, wrote a memo to Convair management pointing out several problems with the door design. McDonnell Douglas had subcontracted design and construction of the DC-10 fuselage to Convair, and Applegate had overseen its development in ways that he felt were reducing the safety of the system. In particular, he noted that the actuator system had been switched from a hydraulic system to an electrical one, which he felt was less safe. He also noted that the floor would be prone to failure if the door was lost, and this would likely sever the control cables, leading to a loss of the aircraft. Finally, he pointed out that this precise failure had already occurred in ground testing in 1970, and he concluded that such an accident was almost certain to occur again in the future.

In spite of these recommendations, on March 3, 1974, less than two years after the near-loss of Flight 96, Turkish Airlines Flight 981 crashed outside Paris, killing all 346 passengers and crew on board after an identical rear cargo door failure. Unlike Flight 96, where the crew still managed to keep enough flight controls to safely return to Detroit, the pilots of Flight 981 completely lost control of the tail surfaces and all hydraulics. Investigators discovered that the upgrades had never been carried out on this airframe, although the construction logs claimed they had been. One modification had been carried out, the installation of the inspection window, along with a placard beside the door controls printed in English and Turkish that informed the operators how to inspect the latches. The operator in Paris was Algerian and could not read either language and had been instructed that as long as the locking handle closed, the door was safe. He also noted that he did not have to force the handle, and investigators concluded that it had already been bent on a prior flight.

In the aftermath of Flight 981, the Applegate memorandum was discovered and introduced into evidence during the massive civil lawsuit that followed. Many commentators subsequently blamed the aircraft manufacturer, McDonnell Douglas, and other aviation authorities, for failing to learn lessons from the Flight 96 accident. Although there had been some redesign of the DC-10 cargo door system, it had only been implemented voluntarily and haphazardly by various airlines. If the warning signs of Flight 96 had been heeded, it is likely that the crash of Flight 981 would have been prevented. A complete redesign of the entire door system followed, and no DC-10 or MD-11 suffered a similar accident again as of 2026.

== Dramatization ==
The crash was featured in the third episode of Season 5 of the Canadian Cineflix documentary series Mayday, on the episode "Behind Closed Doors", which also covers the similar crash of Turkish Airlines Flight 981, which was broadcast on the Discovery Channel Canada and distributed internationally.

The episode "Crash Detectives" of Survival in the Sky featured the accident, as well as the crash of Turkish Flight 981.

== Awards ==
The entire flight crew was awarded American Airlines' highest honor, The Distinguished Service Award for Merit.

== See also ==
- Evergreen International Airlines Flight 17
- List of notable decompression accidents and incidents
