= Cricket (disambiguation) =

Cricket is a bat-and-ball sport contested by two teams.

Cricket also commonly refers to:

- Cricket (insect)

Cricket(s) or The Cricket(s) may also refer to:

== Film and television ==
- The Cricket (1917 film), a silent American drama film
- The Cricket (1980 film), an erotic drama film
- Crickets (film), a 2006 Japanese drama film
- "Cricket" (Bluey), a 2023 television episode
- "Cricket" (Knots Landing), a 1982 television episode
- "Cricket" (Servant), a 2019 television episode
- Christine Blair or Cricket, a character in The Young and the Restless
- Cricket, a character in To Have and Have Not (film)
- Matthew "Rickety Cricket" Mara, a character in It's Always Sunny in Philadelphia
- Cricket Green, a character in Big City Greens

== Literature ==
- Cricket (magazine), an American literary magazine for children
- The Cricket (magazine), a 1960s music magazine
- "Chrząszcz" or "Cricket", a poem by Jan Brzechwa
- Cricket, a character in Fire on the Mountain (1988 novel)

== Military ==
- Cricket-class destroyer, a 1906 class of Royal Navy coastal destroyers
  - HMS Cricket (1906), lead ship of the class
- HMS Cricket (1915), a gunboat
- HMS Cricket (shore establishment), Hampshire, 1943–1946

== Music ==
- The Crickets, a rock and roll band formed by Buddy Holly
- Cricket (musical), a musical by Andrew Lloyd Webber and Tim Rice
- Crickets (Joe Nichols album), 2013
- Crickets (Moka Only and Chief album), and the title track, 2011
- Crickets: Best of the Fading Captain Series 1999–2007, a compilation album by Robert Pollard
- Cricket (producer), Kosovo-Albanian record producer
- Crickets, a video album by Dredg released alongside their 2002 album El Cielo
- "Crickets", a song by Drop City Yacht Club
- "Cricket", a song by the Kinks from Preservation Act 1
- "Crickets", a 2025 track by Toby Fox from Deltarune Chapters 3+4 OST from the video game Deltarune

== Vehicles ==
- Cricket (1914 automobile), an early American automobile
- Plymouth Cricket (disambiguation), two automobiles

== Other uses ==
- Cricket (darts), a game using the standard 20-number dartboard
- Cricket (roofing), a ridge structure designed to divert water on a roof
- Cricket (series), a series of cricket video games
- Cricket (warning sound), an audible warning in the cockpits of commercial aircraft
- Cricket dolls, a talking doll released by Playmates Toys in 1986
- Cricket, North Carolina, United States
- Cricket Wireless, wireless service provider, a subsidiary of AT&T Inc.
- Programmable Cricket, robotic toys
- Clicker or cricket, a noisemaker
- Cricket, a variation of the float breakdancing technique
- Cricket, a data collection software on top of RRDtool
- Cricket (dog), a puppy killed by South Dakota Governor Kristi Noem

== See also ==
- Cricket warbler
- Crickett Smith (1881–1944), American ragtime, blues and jazz cornetist and trumpeter
- Crickette Sanz, American anthropologist
- Cricket House and Cricket Park, in Cricket St Thomas, England
- Colomban Cri-cri, a light plane
- Shturcite, a Bulgarian band, translated as The Crickets, or an album by them
- Tettigoniidae, known as katydids or bush-crickets
- Cricut, a cutting machine for home crafters
