= Kestler =

Kestler is a German surname. Notable people with the surname include:

- Hans Günther Kestler (1939–2013), German chess master
- Izabela Maria Furtado Kestler (1959–2009), Brazilian professor of German studies
- Sonnhild Kestler (* 1963), Swiss textile designer

== See also ==
- Kessler (name)
