= Fatma Ceren Necipoğlu =

Turkish harpist (1973–2009)

- Born: 18 January 1973; Istanbul, Turkey
- Died: 1 June 2009 (aged 36); Atlantic Ocean
- Education: •Istanbul City Convervatory •Istanbul University Conservatory •Department of Harp of the Louisiana State University School of Music •Harp Department of Jacobs School of Music at Indiana University Bloomington
- Known for: Harpist

Fatma Ceren Necipoğlu (18 January 1973 – 1 June 2009) was a Turkish harpist and university lecturer for piano and harp. She was aboard Air France Flight 447 from Rio de Janeiro, Brazil to Paris, France, which crashed in the Atlantic Ocean on 1 June 2009.

== Life and career ==
She was born on 18 January 1973 to Vedat Necipoğlu and his wife Selçuk. She had an elder sister Ayşe İmre (Tüylü).

During her high school education at the Deutsche Schule Istanbul, Fatma Ceren Necipoğlu attended conservatories of Istanbul City and Istanbul University to learn playing harp. Following her highschool graduation in 1992, she studied at the Department of Translation and Interpreting in Boğaziçi University, and received an under-graduate degree in 1997. She went to the United States to study at the Department of Harp ın Louisiana State University School of Music, where she graduated in 1999. Later, she enrolled in the Harp Department of Jacobs School of Music at Indiana University Bloomington and graduated in 2001.

Having returned to Turkey, she joined the Regional State Symphony Orchestra in Bursa, and later became lecturer for piano and harp at the Anadolu University in Eskişehir.

She was invited to the Fourth Rio Harp Festival to perform two recitals, and was on her way back home via Paris aboard Air France Flight 447. Brazilian military planes found debris and dead bodies about 600 miles off Brazil's northeastern coast five days later from the disappearance of the aircraft.

Necipoğlu gave numerous recitals and concerts in Turkey and abroad. She also received many international awards.

== Memorial service ==
Two and a half years after the accident, the body of Necipoğlu was recovered from the ocean bed and flown to Turkey. Her remains were laid to rest on 24 November 2011 in Kanlıca Cemetery, Istanbul following a religious service at the Teşvikiye Mosque.
