= Air France Flight 447 =

2009 aircraft accident in the Atlantic Ocean

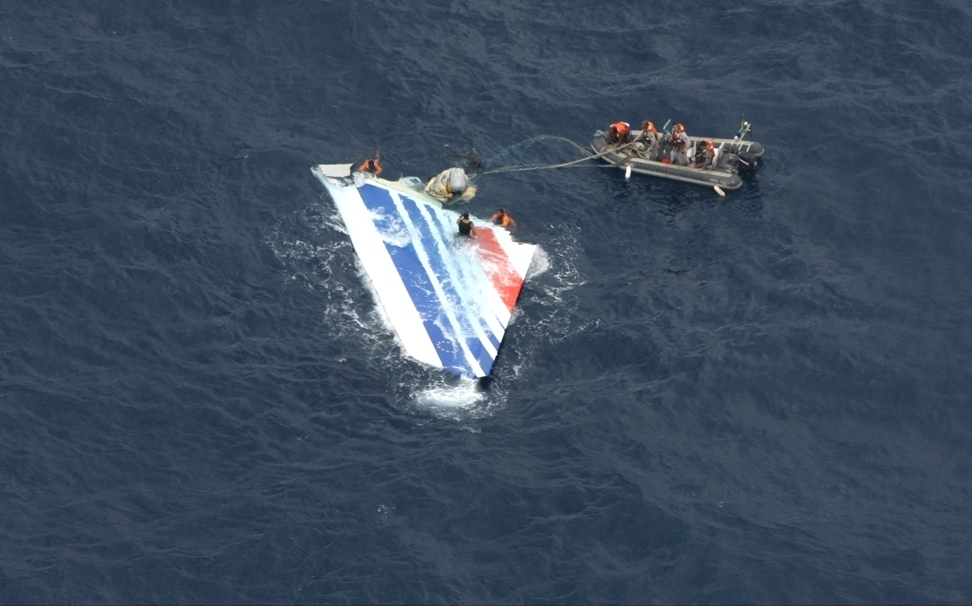
- The aircraft's vertical stabilizer being recovered from the Atlantic Ocean

Accident
- Date: 1 June 2009
- Summary: Entered high-altitude stall, impacted ocean
- Site: South Atlantic Ocean near waypoint TASIL; 3°03′57″N 30°33′42″W

Aircraft
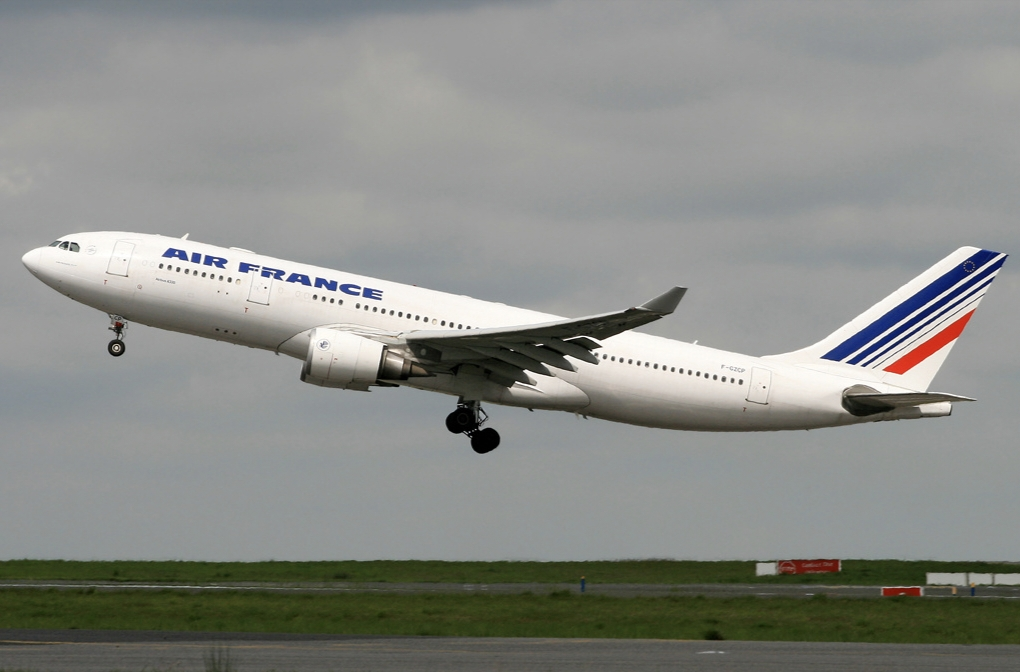
- F-GZCP, the aircraft involved in the accident, pictured in May 2009
- Aircraft type: Airbus A330-203 (Note: The 2 in the suffix denotes that it was a -200 series variant of the A330; 03 denotes that it was equipped with General Electric CF6-80E1A3 engines.)
- Operator: Air France
- IATA flight No.: AF447
- ICAO flight No.: AFR447
- Call sign: AIRFRANS 447
- Registration: F-GZCP
- Flight origin: Rio de Janeiro/Galeão International Airport, Rio de Janeiro, Brazil
- Destination: Charles de Gaulle Airport, Paris, France
- Occupants: 228
- Passengers: 216
- Crew: 12
- Fatalities: 228
- Survivors: 0

Air France Flight 447 was a scheduled international transatlantic passenger flight from Rio de Janeiro, Brazil, to Paris Charles de Gaulle Airport, France, that crashed into the mid-Atlantic Ocean on 1 June 2009, killing all 228 passengers and crew on board. The incident, which occurred on an Airbus A330, happened because inconsistent airspeed indications and resulting miscommunication between the pilots led to an unrecoverable stall. The Brazilian Navy recovered the first major wreckage and two bodies from the sea within five days of the crash. The aircraft's flight recorders were not recovered from the ocean floor until May 2011, nearly two years after the accident.

France's Bureau of Enquiry and Analysis for Civil Aviation Safety final report, released at a press conference on 5 July 2012, concluded that the aircraft suffered temporary inconsistencies between the airspeed measurements—likely resulting from ice crystals obstructing the aircraft's pitot tubes—which caused the autopilot to disconnect. First Officer Pierre Bonin reacted incorrectly to this and repeatedly pulled back on the control stick, causing the aircraft to enter an aerodynamic stall which the pilots failed to correct. The accident is the deadliest in the history of Air France, as well as the deadliest aviation accident involving the Airbus A330.

On 21 May 2026, Airbus and Air France were both found guilty of corporate manslaughter. Each company was sentenced to pay the maximum fine of €225,000 ($261,112).

== Aircraft ==
The aircraft involved was a four-year-old Airbus A330-203, with serial number 0660, registered as F-GZCP. It was delivered to the airline in April 2005. The aircraft was powered by two General Electric CF6-80E1A3 engines with a maximum thrust of 304.8 or 268.7 kN (68,530 or 60,400 lbf) (take-off/max continuous), with a cruising speed of Mach 0.82 to Mach 0.86 (470 to 500 kn; 880 to 920 km/h; 540 to 570 mph), at 35,000 feet (11,000 m) of altitude and a range of 12,500 km (6,700 nmi; 7,800 mi). The aircraft underwent a major overhaul on 16 April 2009, and at the time of the accident it had accumulated about 18,870 flying hours. It was the last Airbus A330 delivered to the airline.

== Passengers and crew ==
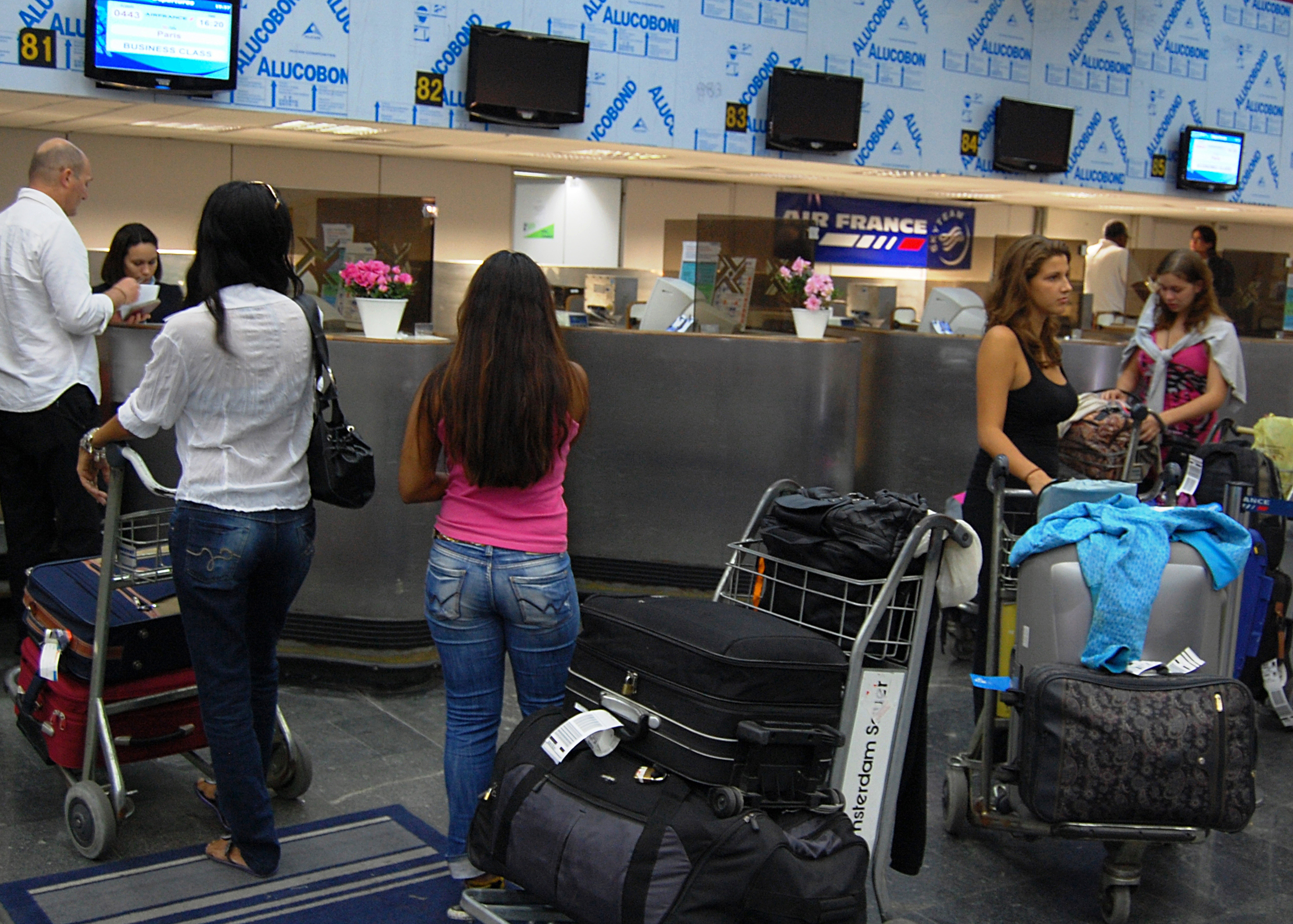
Passengers checking in for AF443, another Rio de Janeiro-Paris route, on the day of AF447's disappearance.

Final tally of passenger nationalities
| Nationality | Passengers | Crew | Total |
|---|---|---|---|
| Argentina | 1 | 0 | 1 |
| Austria | 1 | 0 | 1 |
| Belgium | 1 | 0 | 1 |
| Brazil | 58 | 1 | 59 |
| Canada | 1 | 0 | 1 |
| China | 9 | 0 | 9 |
| Croatia | 1 | 0 | 1 |
| Denmark | 1 | 0 | 1 |
| Estonia | 1 | 0 | 1 |
| France | 61 | 11 | 72 |
| Gabon | 1 | 0 | 1 |
| Germany | 26 | 0 | 26 |
| Hungary | 4 | 0 | 4 |
| Iceland | 1 | 0 | 1 |
| Ireland | 3 | 0 | 3 |
| Italy | 9 | 0 | 9 |
| Lebanon | 3 | 0 | 3 |
| Morocco | 3 | 0 | 3 |
| Netherlands | 1 | 0 | 1 |
| Norway | 3 | 0 | 3 |
| Philippines | 1 | 0 | 1 |
| Poland | 2 | 0 | 2 |
| Romania | 1 | 0 | 1 |
| Russia | 1 | 0 | 1 |
| Slovakia | 3 | 0 | 3 |
| South Africa | 1 | 0 | 1 |
| South Korea | 1 | 0 | 1 |
| Spain | 2 | 0 | 2 |
| Sweden | 1 (2) | 0 | 1 (2) |
| Switzerland | 6 | 0 | 6 |
| Turkey | 1 | 0 | 1 |
| United Kingdom | 5 | 0 | 5 |
| United States | 2 | 0 | 2 |
| Total | 216 | 12 | 228 |
Notes: Nationalities shown are as stated by Air France on 1 June 2009.; Attributing nationality was complicated by the holding of multiple citizenship by several passengers.; Passengers who had citizenship in one country but were attributed to another country by Air France are indicated with parentheses ().

The aircraft was carrying 216 passengers, 3 aircrew, and 9 cabin crew in two cabins of service. Among the 216 passengers were 126 men, 82 women and 8 children (including 1 infant).

There were three pilots on the flight:

- The pilot in command, 58-year-old Captain Marc Dubois (pilot not flying, PNF) had joined Air France in February 1988 from rival French domestic carrier Air Inter (which later merged into Air France), and had 10,988 flying hours, of which 6,258 were as captain, including 1,700 hours on the Airbus A330; he had carried out 16 rotations in the South America sector since arriving in the A330/A340 division in 2007.
- The cruise relief co-pilot in the left seat, 37-year-old First Officer David Robert (PNF) had joined Air France in July 1998 and had 6,547 flying hours, of which 4,479 hours were on the Airbus A330; he had carried out 39 rotations in the South America sector since arriving in the A330/A340 division in 2002. Robert had graduated from École nationale de l'aviation civile, one of the elite Grandes Écoles, and had transitioned from a pilot to a management job at the airline's operations center. He served as a pilot on the flight to maintain his flying credentials.
- The co-pilot in the right seat, 32-year-old First Officer Pierre-Cédric Bonin (pilot flying, PF) had joined Air France in October 2003 and had 2,936 flight hours, of which 807 hours were on the Airbus A330; he had carried out five rotations in the South America sector since arriving in the A330/A340 division in 2008. His wife Isabelle, a physics teacher, was also on board.

There were 9 cabin crew members on the flight:

- Senior Purser Anne Grimout (49), 25 years' service, Purser Françoise Sonnic (54), 28 years' service, and Purser Maryline Messaud (45), 20 years' service.
- Flight Attendants Laurence Desmots (44), 18 years' service, Stéphanie Schoumacker (38), 13 years' service, Sébastien Vedovati (33), 11 years' service, Clara Amado (31), 8 years' service, Carole Guillaumont (31), 5 years' service, and Lucas Gagliano (23), 2 years' service.

Of the 12 crew members (including aircrew and cabin crew), 11 were French and 1 was Brazilian.

The majority of passengers were French, Brazilian, or German citizens. The passengers included business and holiday travelers.

Air France established a crisis center at Terminal 2D for the 60 to 70 relatives and friends who arrived at Charles de Gaulle Airport to pick up arriving passengers, but many of the passengers on Flight 447 were connecting to other destinations worldwide. In the days that followed, Air France contacted close to 2,000 people who were related to, or friends of, the victims.

On 20 June 2009, Air France announced that each victim's family would be paid roughly €17,500 in initial compensation.

=== Notable passengers ===
- Prince Pedro Luiz of Orléans-Braganza, third in succession to the abolished throne of Brazil and grandnephew of Grand Duke Jean of Luxembourg. He had dual Brazilian–Belgian citizenship. He was returning home to Luxembourg from a visit to his relatives in Rio de Janeiro.
- Giambattista Lenzi, member of the Regional Council of Trentino-Alto Adige.
- Silvio Barbato, composer and former conductor of the symphony orchestras of the Cláudio Santoro National Theater in Brasília and the Rio de Janeiro Municipal Theater; he was en route to Kyiv for engagements there.
- Octavio Augusto Ceva Antunes, professor of chemistry and pharmaceutics at the Federal University of Rio de Janeiro.
- Fatma Ceren Necipoğlu, Turkish classical harpist and academic of Anadolu University in Eskişehir; she was returning home via Paris after performing at the fourth Rio Harp Festival.
- Izabela Maria Furtado Kestler, professor of German studies at the Federal University of Rio de Janeiro.
- Pablo Dreyfus from Argentina, campaigner for controlling illegal arms and the illegal drugs trade.

== Accident ==
Approximate flight path of AF 447: The solid red line shows the actual route. The dashed line indicates the planned route beginning with the position of the last transmission heard. All times are UTC.

The aircraft departed Rio de Janeiro–Galeão International Airport on 31 May 2009 at 19:29 Brazilian Standard Time (22:29 UTC), with a scheduled arrival at Paris-Charles de Gaulle Airport of 11:03 Central European Summer Time (09:03 UTC) the following day (estimated flight time of 10:34). Voice contact with the aircraft was lost around 01:35 UTC, 3 hours and 6 minutes after departure. The last message reported that the aircraft had passed waypoint INTOL (1°21′39″S 32°49′53″W), located 565 km (351 mi; 305 nmi) from Natal, on Brazil's northeastern coast. The aircraft left Brazilian Atlantic radar surveillance at 01:49 UTC, and entered a communication dead zone.

The Airbus A330 is designed to be flown by two pilots, but the 13-hour "duty time" (the total flight duration, as well as preflight and post flight duties) exceeded the 10 hours permitted before a pilot had to take a rest, as dictated by Air France's procedures. To comply with these procedures, Flight 447 was crewed by three pilots: a captain and two first officers. With three pilots on board, each pilot could take a break in the A330's crew rest compartment, located behind the cockpit.

In accordance with common practice, Captain Dubois sent First Officer Robert for the first rest period with the intention of taking the second break himself. At 01:55 UTC, he woke up First Officer Robert and said, "... he's going to take my place". After attending the briefing between the two co-pilots, the captain left the cockpit to rest at 02:01:46 UTC. At 02:06 UTC, the pilot warned the cabin crew that they were about to enter an area of turbulence. About two to three minutes later, the aircraft encountered icing conditions. The cockpit voice recorder (CVR) recorded sounds akin to hail or graupel on the outside of the aircraft and ice crystals began to accumulate in the pitot tubes, which measure airspeed. Bonin, the pilot flying, turned the aircraft slightly to the left and decreased its speed from Mach 0.82 to 0.80, which was the recommended speed to penetrate turbulence. The engine anti-ice system was also turned on.

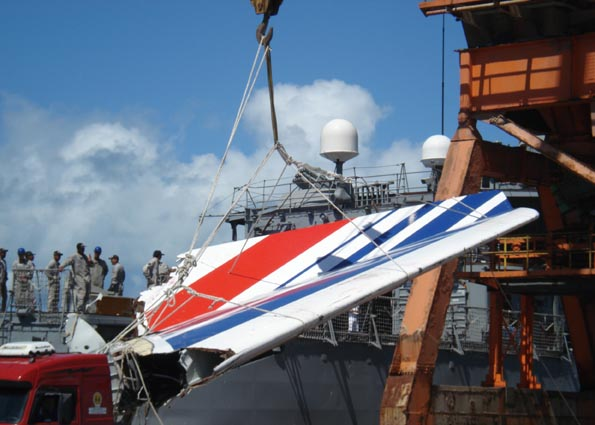
The aircraft's vertical stabilizer after its recovery from the ocean

At 02:10:05 UTC, the autopilot disengaged, most likely because the pitot tubes had iced over, and the aircraft transitioned from "normal law" to "alternate law 2 (ALT2)" due to the lack of reliable flight data. The engines' autothrust systems disengaged three seconds later. The autopilot disconnect warning was heard on the CVR.

Bonin took manual control of the aircraft. Without the autopilot, turbulence caused the aircraft to start to roll to the right, and Bonin reacted by deflecting his side-stick to the left. One consequence of the change to ALT2 was the removal of both the dampers to control inputs, as well as maximum limitations to the A330's safe pitch, yaw and bank angles. Due to this increase in the aircraft's sensitivity to roll, the pilot overcorrected. During the next 30 seconds, the aircraft rolled alternately left and right as he adjusted to the altered handling characteristics of the aircraft. At the same time, he abruptly pulled back on his side-stick, raising the nose. This action was unnecessary and excessive under the circumstances. The aircraft's stall warning briefly sounded twice because the angle of attack tolerance was exceeded, and the aircraft's indicated airspeed dropped sharply from 274 to 52 knots (507 to 96 km/h; 315 to 60 mph). The aircraft's angle of attack increased, and the aircraft subsequently began to climb above its cruising altitude of 35,000 ft (FL350). During this ascent, the aircraft attained vertical speeds well in excess of the typical rate of climb for the Airbus A330, which usually ascends at rates no greater than 2,000 feet per minute (10 m/s; 37 km/h). The aircraft experienced a peak vertical speed close to 7,000 feet per minute (36 m/s; 130 km/h), which occurred as Bonin brought the rolling movements under control.

At 02:10:34 UTC, after displaying incorrectly for half a minute, the left-side instruments recorded a sharp rise in airspeed to 223 knots (413 km/h; 257 mph), as did the integrated standby instrument system (ISIS) 33 seconds later. The right-side instruments were not recorded by the flight data recorder. The icing event had lasted for just over a minute, yet Bonin continued to make nose-up inputs. The trimmable horizontal stabilizer (THS) moved from 3 to 13° nose-up in about one minute, and remained in the latter position until the end of the flight.

At 02:11:10 UTC, the aircraft had climbed to its maximum altitude around 38,000 feet (11,600 metres). At this point, the aircraft's angle of attack was 16°, and the engine thrust levers were in the fully forward takeoff/go-around (TOGA) detent. As the aircraft began to descend, the angle of attack rapidly increased toward 30°. A second consequence of the reconfiguration into ALT2 was that the stall protection no longer operated, whereas in normal law, the aircraft's flight-management computers would have acted to prevent such a high angle of attack. The wings lost lift and the aircraft began to stall.

Confused, Bonin exclaimed, "I don't have control of the aircraft any more now", and two seconds later, "I don't have control of the aircraft at all!" Robert responded to this by saying, "controls to the left", and took over control of the aircraft. He pushed his side-stick forward to lower the nose and recover from the stall; however, Bonin was still pulling his side-stick back. The inputs cancelled each other out and triggered an audible "dual input" warning.

At 02:11:40 UTC, Dubois re-entered the cockpit after being summoned by Robert. The angle of attack had then reached 40°, and the aircraft had descended to 35,000 feet (11,000 m) with the engines running at almost 100% N_{1} (the rotational speed of the front intake fan, which delivers most of a turbofan engine's thrust). The stall warnings stopped, as all airspeed indications were now considered invalid by the aircraft's computer because of the high angle of attack. The aircraft had its nose above the horizon, but was descending steeply.

Roughly 20 seconds later, at 02:12 UTC, Bonin decreased the aircraft's pitch slightly. Airspeed indications became valid, and the stall warning sounded again; it then sounded intermittently for the remaining duration of the flight, stopping only when the pilots increased the aircraft's nose-up pitch. From there until the end of the flight, the angle of attack never dropped below 35°. From the time the aircraft stalled until its impact with the ocean, the engines were primarily developing either 100% N_{1} or TOGA thrust, though they were briefly spooled down to about 50% N_{1} on two occasions. The engines always responded to commands and were developing in excess of 100% N_{1} when the flight ended. Robert responded to Dubois by saying, "We've lost all control of the aeroplane, we don't understand anything, we've tried everything". Soon after this, Robert said to himself, "climb" four consecutive times. Bonin heard this and replied, "But I've been at maximum nose-up for a while!" When Dubois heard this, he realized Bonin was causing the stall, and shouted, "No no no, don't climb! No No No!" When Robert heard this, he told Bonin to give him control of the aircraft, and Bonin initially obliged.

The aircraft was now too low to recover from the stall. Robert pushed his side-stick forward to try to regain lift in order to get out of the stall; however, shortly thereafter, the ground proximity warning system sounded a "sink rate" alarm followed by "pull up" alarms. In response, Bonin (without informing his colleagues) pulled his side-stick all the way back again, and said, "We're going to crash! This can't be true. But what's happening?" The last recording on the CVR was Dubois saying, "(ten) (Note: The BEA was unable to positively identify this word, hence it was enclosed in parentheses on the CVR transcript.CITEREFBEA_final_appx12012) degrees pitch attitude."

Both flight recorders stopped recording at 02:14:28 UTC, 3 hours and 45 minutes after takeoff. At that point, the aircraft's ground speed was recorded as 107 knots (198 km/h; 123 mph), and the aircraft was descending at 10,912 feet per minute (55.43 m/s), a vertical speed of 108 knots (200 km/h; 124 mph). Its pitch was 16.2° nose-up, with a roll angle of 5.3° to the left. During its descent, the aircraft had turned more than 180° to the right to a compass heading of 270°. The aircraft remained stalled during its entire 3-minute-30-second descent from 38,000 feet (12,000 m). The aircraft struck the ocean belly-first at a speed of 152 knots (282 km/h; 175 mph), comprising vertical and horizontal components of 108 knots (200 km/h; 124 mph) and 107 knots (198 km/h; 123 mph), respectively. All 228 passengers and crew on board died on impact from extreme trauma and the aircraft was destroyed.

=== Automated messages ===
Air France's A330s are equipped with a communications system, Aircraft Communications Addressing and Reporting System (ACARS), which enables them to transmit data messages via VHF or satellite. (Note: At the time of its disappearance, F-GZCP was using satellite communication, its position over the mid-Atlantic being too far from land-based receivers for VHF to be effective.) ACARS can be used by the aircraft's on-board computers to send messages automatically, and F-GZCP transmitted a position report about every 10 minutes. Its final position report at 02:10:34 gave the aircraft's coordinates as 2°59′N 30°35′W. (Note: On the map, the coordinates in BEA's first interim report with the information on page 13 is referenced as the "last known position" (French: Dernière position connue, "last known position").)

In addition to the routine position reports, F-GZCP's centralized maintenance system sent a series of messages via ACARS in the minutes immediately prior to its disappearance. These messages, sent to prepare maintenance workers on the ground prior to arrival, were transmitted between 02:10 UTC and 02:15 UTC, and consisted of 5 failure reports and 19 warnings.

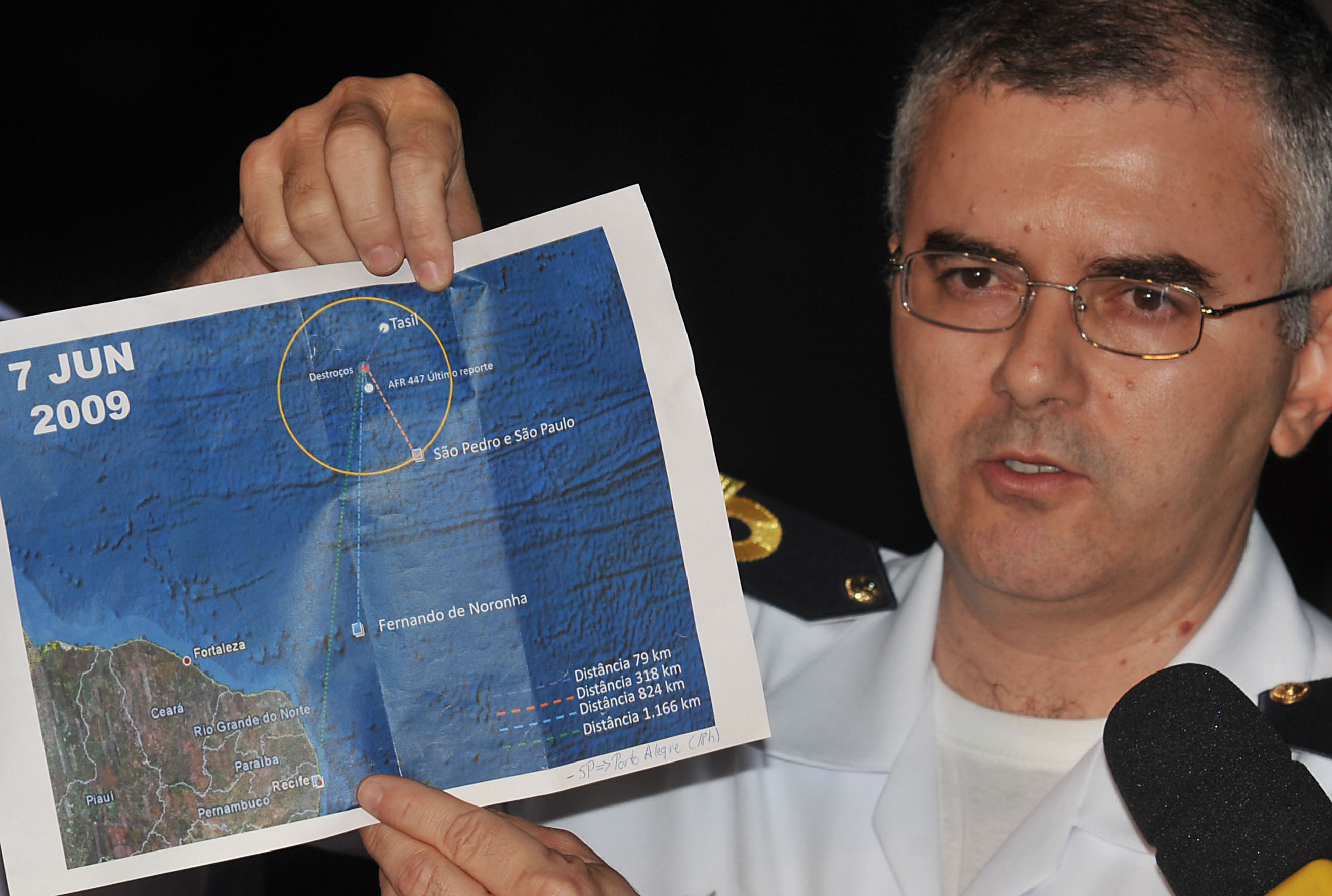
Recife, 8 June 2009; Brazilian Navy Commander Giucemar Tabosa Cardoso shows the map with the location of the remains of the Airbus A330-203.

Among the ACARS transmissions at 02:10 is one message that indicates a fault in the pitot-static system. Bruno Sinatti, president of Alter, Air France's third-biggest pilots' union, stated, "Piloting becomes very difficult, near impossible, without reliable speed data." The 12 warning messages with the same time code indicate that the autopilot and autothrust system had disengaged, that the traffic collision avoidance system was in fault mode, and that the flight mode went from "normal law" to "alternate law (ALT)".

The remainder of the messages occurred from 02:11 UTC to 02:14 UTC, containing a fault message for an air data inertial reference unit and ISIS. At 02:12 UTC, a warning message NAV ADR DISAGREE indicated that a disagreement existed between the three independent air data systems. (Note: More precisely: that after one of the three independent systems had been diagnosed as faulty and excluded from consideration, the two remaining systems disagreed.) At 02:13 UTC, a fault message for the flight management guidance and envelope computer was sent. One of the two final messages transmitted at 02:14 UTC was a warning referring to the air data reference system, the other ADVISORY was a "cabin vertical speed warning", indicating that the aircraft was descending at a high rate.

==== The 24 ACARS messages ====
| Hours | Code | Interpretation |
|---|---|---|
| 22:45 | FAILURE LAV CONF | Malfunction toilet |
| 02:10 | WARNING AUTO FLT AP OFF | Disconnecting the autopilot |
| 02:10 | WARNING AUTO FLT | Unknown |
| 02:10 | WARNING F/CTL ALTN LAW | The Fly-by-wire system switches from normal mode (Normal Law) to alternative mode (Alternate Law), deactivating many flight safety systems. |
| 02:10 | WARNING FLAG ON CAPT PFD | On the Primary Flight Display (PFD) on the commander's side (CM1) - the incorrect speed alarm sounds. |
| 02:10 | WARNING FLAG ON F/O PFD | On the Primary Flight Display (PFD) on the first officer's side (CM2) - incorrect airspeed alarm sounds. |
| 02:10 | WARNING AUTO FLT A/THR OFF | The autothrottle, the flight automation subsystem that operates the engine throttles (like the autopilot operates the flight controls), disconnects. |
| 02:10 | WARNING NAV TCAS FAULT | The collision avoidance system (TCAS) fails and is deactivated. TCAS relies on airspeed data to project the path of the plane in order to identify any potential traffic conflict. |
| 02:10 | WARNING FLAG ON CAPT PFD | On the Primary Flight Display (PFD) on the commander's side (CM1) - the incorrect speed alarm sounds |
| 02:10 | WARNING FLAG ON F/O PFD | On the Primary Flight Display (PFD) on the first officer's side (CM2) - incorrect airspeed alarm sounds. |
| 02:10 | WARNING F/CTL RUD TRV LIM FAULT | The message indicates that the Rudder travel limiter has been deactivated - restoring the maximum deflection on the rudder. |
| 02:10 | WARNING MAINTENANCE STATUS | Unknown |
| 02:10 | WARNING MAINTENANCE STATUS | Unknown |
| 02:10 | FAILURE EFCS2 1 | Other problems with the Electronic Flight Control System |
| 02:10 | FAILURE EFCS1 X2 | Other problems with the Electronic Flight Control System |
| 02:11 | WARNING FLAG ON CAPT PFD | On the Primary Flight Display (PFD) on the commander's side (CM1) - the incorrect speed alarm sounds. |
| 02:11 | WARNING FLAG ON F/O PFD | On the Primary Flight Display (PFD) on the first officer's side (CM2) - incorrect airspeed alarm sounds. |
| 02:12 | WARNING NAV ADR DISAGREE | Discrepancies are detected by the Air Data Reference (ADR) when acquiring vital data such as speed and flight attitude (AoA) - Possible false alarm. |
| 02:12 | FAILURE ISIS 1 | Problems on the electronic artificial horizon - Integrated Stand-by Instrument |
| 02:12 | FAILURE IR2 1,EFCS1X,IR1,IR3 | Other problems with the aircraft's inertial systems (IR1,IR2,IR3) and with the Fly-by-wire |
| 02:13 | WARNING F/CTL PRIM 1 FAULT | The primary computer that manages the control surfaces goes into error and is deactivated (probably due to significant discrepancies and errors acquired from the flight data). |
| 02:13 | WARNING F/CTL SEC 1 FAULT | Computer malfunction inherent to control surfaces (Spoiler and Elevator Computer) - (possibly due to significant discrepancies and errors acquired from flight data). |
| 02:14 | WARNING MAINTENANCE STATUS | Unknown |
| 02:14 | FAILURE AFS | The Automatic Flight System turns off. |
| 02:14 | WARNING ADVISORY | This message may indicate a too rapid descent or depressurization of the aircraft, although it cannot be ruled out that it is distorted by instrumentation errors. |

=== Weather conditions ===
Weather conditions in the mid-Atlantic were normal for the time of year, and included a broad band of thunderstorms along the Intertropical Convergence Zone (ITCZ). A meteorological analysis of the area surrounding the flight path showed a mesoscale convective system extending to an altitude of around 50,000 feet (15,000 m) above the Atlantic Ocean before Flight 447 disappeared. During its final hour, Flight 447 encountered areas of light turbulence.

Commercial air transport crews routinely encounter this type of storm in this area. With the aircraft under the control of its automated systems, one of the main tasks occupying the cockpit crew was that of monitoring the progress of the flight through the ITCZ, using the on-board weather radar to avoid areas of significant turbulence. Twelve other flights had recently shared more or less the same route that Flight 447 was using at the time of the accident.

== Search and recovery ==
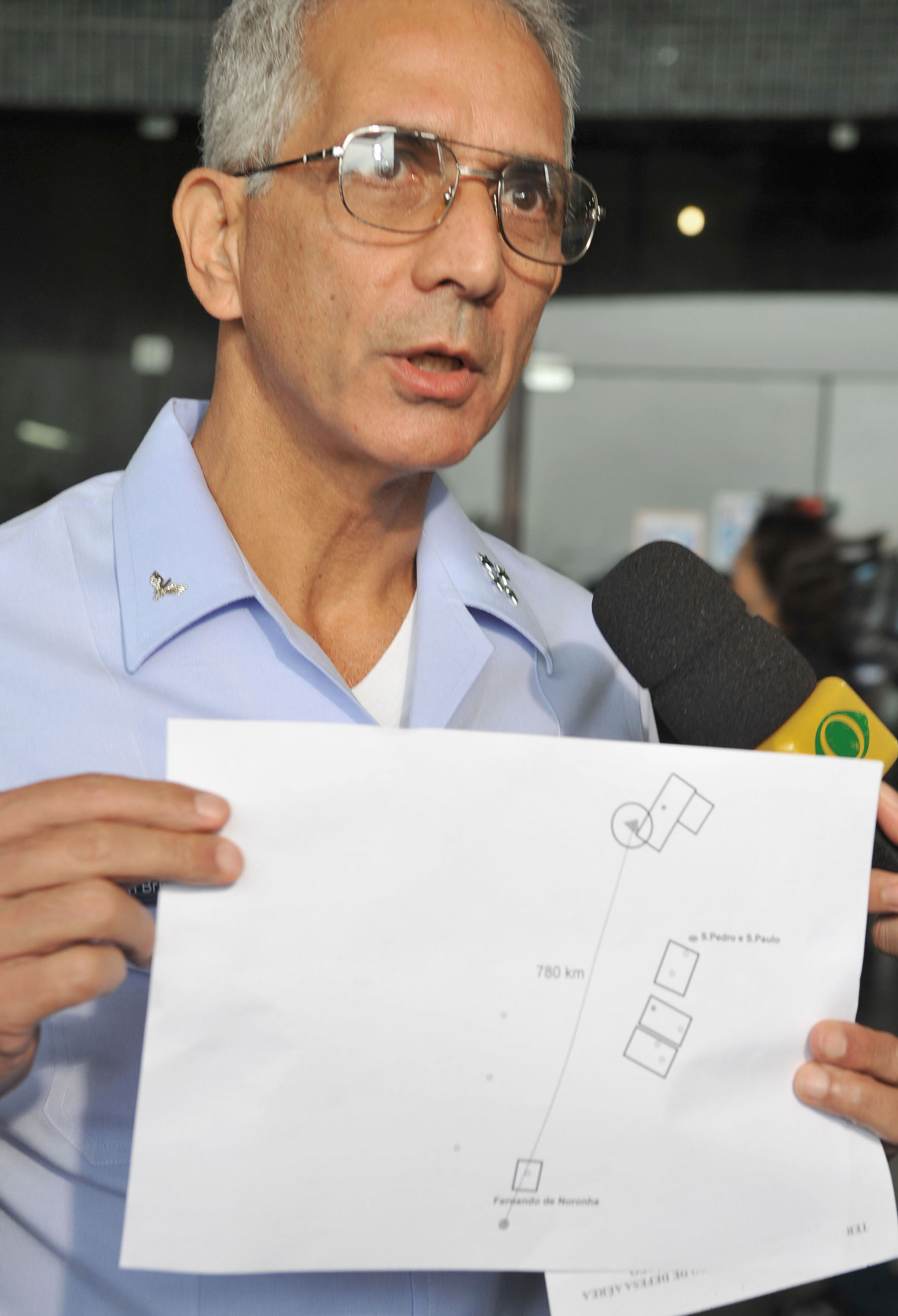
Brigadier Ramon Borges Cardoso speaks to the media about the search for the crashed aircraft.

=== Surface search ===
Flight 447 was due to pass from Brazilian airspace into Senegalese airspace around 02:20 (UTC) on 1 June, and then into Cape Verdean airspace at roughly 03:45. Shortly after 04:00, when the flight had failed to contact air traffic control in either Senegal or Cape Verde, the controller in Senegal attempted to contact the aircraft. When he received no response, he asked the crew of another Air France flight (AF459) to try to contact AF447; this was also met with no success.

After further attempts to contact Flight 447 were unsuccessful, an aerial search for the missing Airbus commenced from both sides of the Atlantic. A Brazilian Air Force aircraft from the archipelago of Fernando de Noronha and a French reconnaissance aircraft based in Dakar, Senegal, led the search. They were assisted by a Casa 235 maritime patrol aircraft from Spain and a United States Navy Lockheed Martin P-3 Orion anti-submarine warfare and maritime patrol aircraft.

By early afternoon on 1 June, officials with Air France and the French government had already presumed the aircraft had been lost with no survivors. An Air France spokesperson told L'Express that "no hope for survivors" remained, and French president Nicolas Sarkozy announced almost no chance existed for anyone to have survived. On 2 June at 15:20 (UTC), a Brazilian Air Force Embraer R-99A spotted wreckage and signs of oil, possibly jet fuel, strewn along a 5 km (3 mi; 3 nmi) band 650 km (400 mi; 350 nmi) north-east of Fernando de Noronha Island, near the Saint Peter and Saint Paul Archipelago. The sighted wreckage included an aircraft seat, an orange buoy, a barrel, and "white pieces and electrical conductors". Later that day, after meeting with relatives of the Brazilians on the aircraft, Brazilian defence minister Nelson Jobim announced that the Air Force believed the wreckage was from Flight 447. Brazilian vice-president José Alencar (acting as president since Luiz Inácio Lula da Silva was out of the country) declared three days of official mourning.

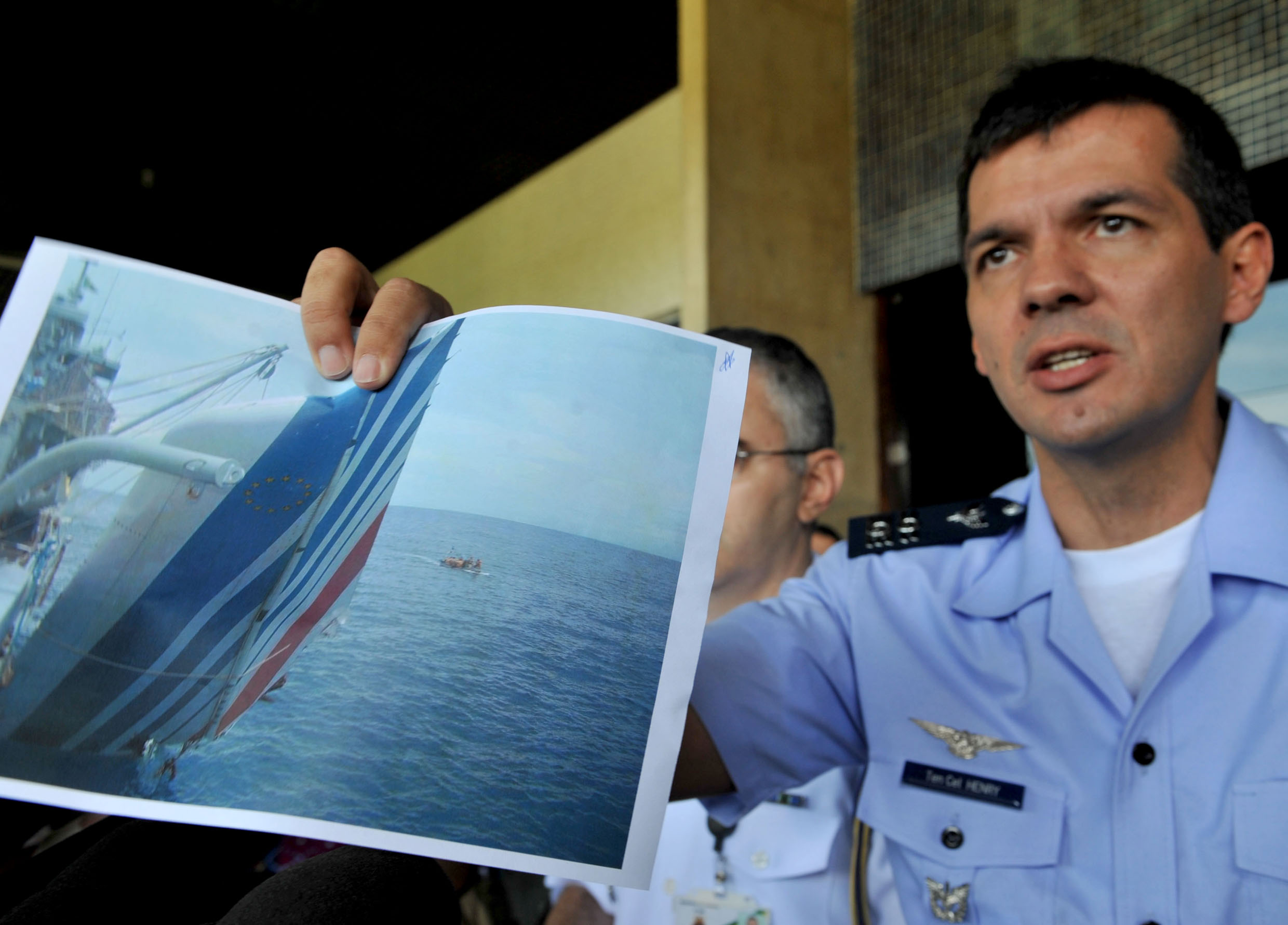
Lt. Col. Henry Munhoz describes the recovery of Airbus A330 wreckage from the ocean.

Also on 2 June, two French Navy vessels, the frigate Ventôse and helicopter-carrier Mistral, were en route to the suspected crash site. Other ships sent to the site included the French research vessel Pourquoi Pas?, equipped with two mini submarines able to descend to 6,000 m (20,000 ft), since the area of the Atlantic in which the aircraft went down was thought to be as deep as 4,700 m (15,400 ft).

On 3 June, the first Brazilian Navy (the "Marinha do Brasil") ship, the patrol boat Grajaú, reached the area in which the first debris was spotted. The Brazilian Navy sent a total of five ships to the debris site; the frigate Constituição and the corvette Caboclo were scheduled to reach the area on 4 June, the frigate Bosísio on 6 June and the replenishment oiler Almirante Gastão Motta on 7 June.

Early on 6 June 2009, five days after Flight 447 disappeared, two male bodies, the first to be recovered from the crashed aircraft, were brought on board Caboclo along with a seat, a nylon backpack containing a computer and vaccination card, and a leather briefcase containing a boarding pass for the Air France flight. Initially, media (including The Boston Globe, the Los Angeles Times, and the Chicago Tribune) cited unnamed investigators in their reporting that the recovered bodies were naked, which implied the plane had broken up at high altitude. However, the notion that the aircraft fragmented while airborne ultimately was refuted by investigators. At this point, on the evidence of the recovered bodies and materials, investigators confirmed the plane had crashed, killing everyone on board. The following day, 7 June, search crews recovered the Airbus's vertical stabilizer, the first major piece of wreckage to be discovered. Pictures of this part being lifted onto Constituição became a poignant symbol of the loss of the Air France craft.

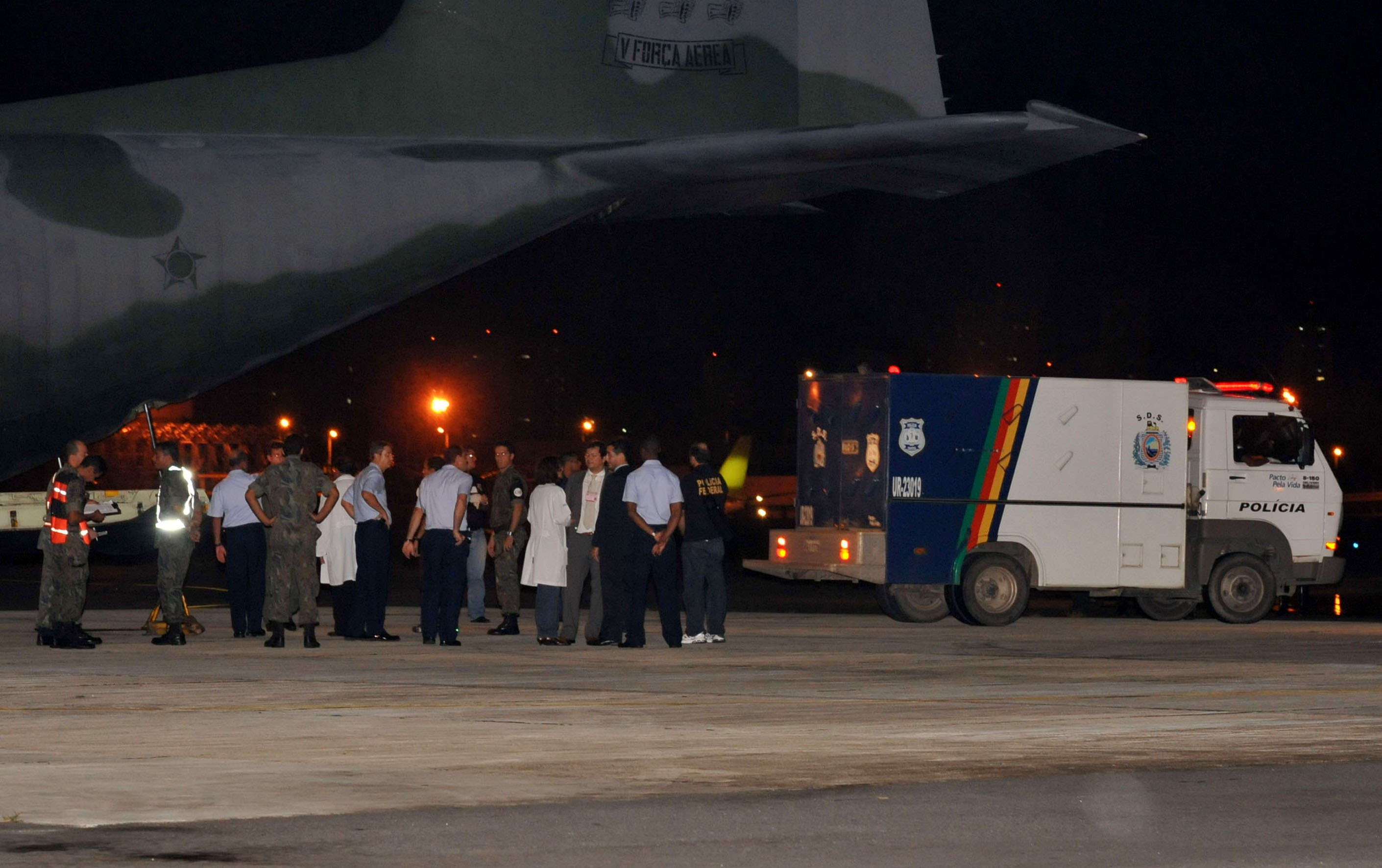
The bodies found in the ocean were transferred to the morgue in Brazil for autopsy and identification.

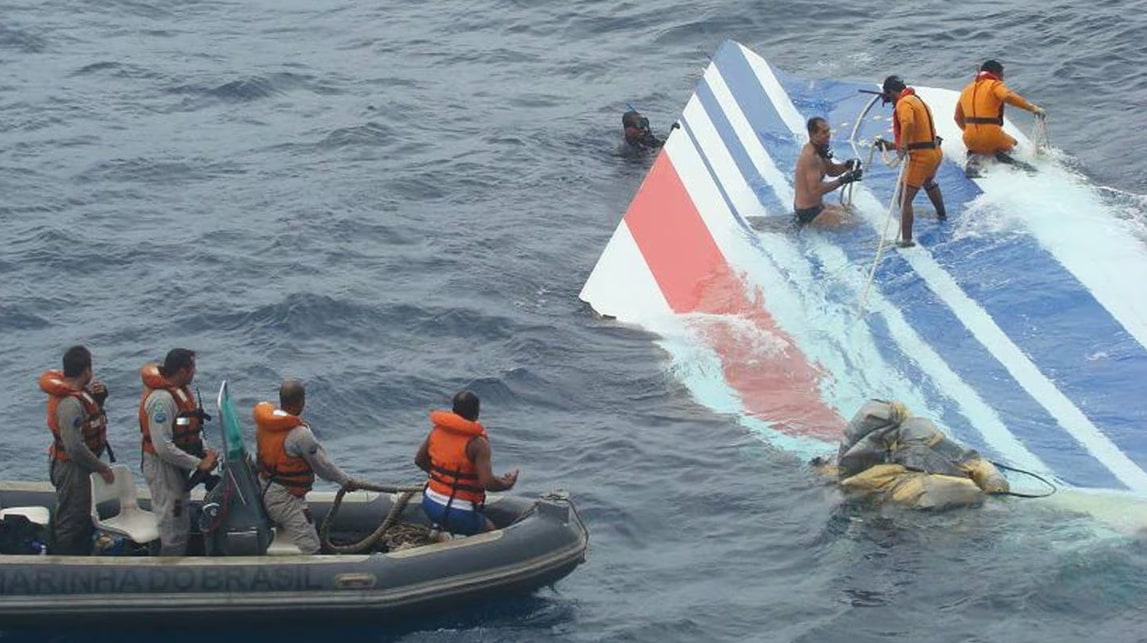
The vertical stabilizer being recovered

The search and recovery effort reached its peak over the next week or so, as the number of personnel mobilized by the Brazilian military exceeded 1,100. (Note: 850 from its Navy and 250 Air Force.) Fifteen aircraft (including two helicopters) were devoted to the search mission. The Brazilian Air Force Embraer R99 flew for more than 100 hours, and electronically scanned more than one million square kilometres (390,000 square miles; 290,000 square nautical miles) of ocean. Other aircraft involved in the search scanned, visually, 320,000 square kilometres (120,000 sq mi; 93,000 sq nmi) of ocean and were used to direct Navy vessels involved in the recovery effort.

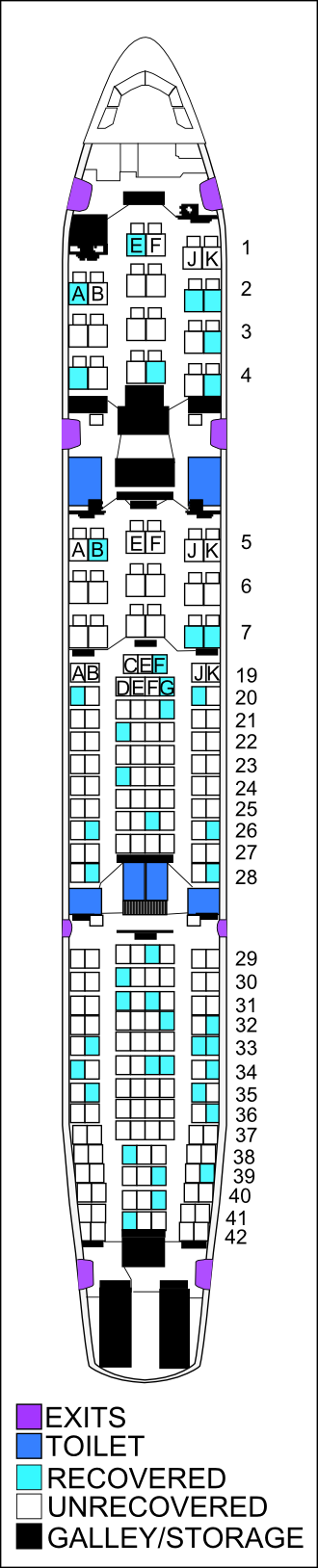
Seat map showing locations of the recovered bodies during the 2009 search operations.

By 16 June 2009, 50 bodies had been recovered from a wide area of the ocean. They were transported to shore, first by the frigates Constituição and Bosísio to Fernando de Noronha, and thereafter by air to Recife for identification. Pathologists identified all 50 bodies recovered from the crash site, including that of the captain, by using dental records and fingerprints. The search teams logged the time and location of every find in a database which, by the time the search ended on 26 June, catalogued 640 items of debris from the aircraft.

The BEA documented the timeline of discoveries in its first interim report.

=== Underwater search ===
On 5 June 2009, the French nuclear submarine Émeraude was dispatched to the crash zone, arriving in the area on the 10th. Its mission was to assist in the search for the missing flight recorders or "black boxes" that might be located at great depth. The submarine would use its sonar to listen for the ultrasonic signal emitted by the black boxes' "pingers", covering 34 square kilometres (13 sq mi; 9.8 sq nmi) per day. Émeraude was to work with the mini-sub Nautile, which could descend to the ocean floor. The French submarines would be aided by two U.S. underwater audio devices capable of picking up signals at a depth of 6,000 metres (20,000 ft).

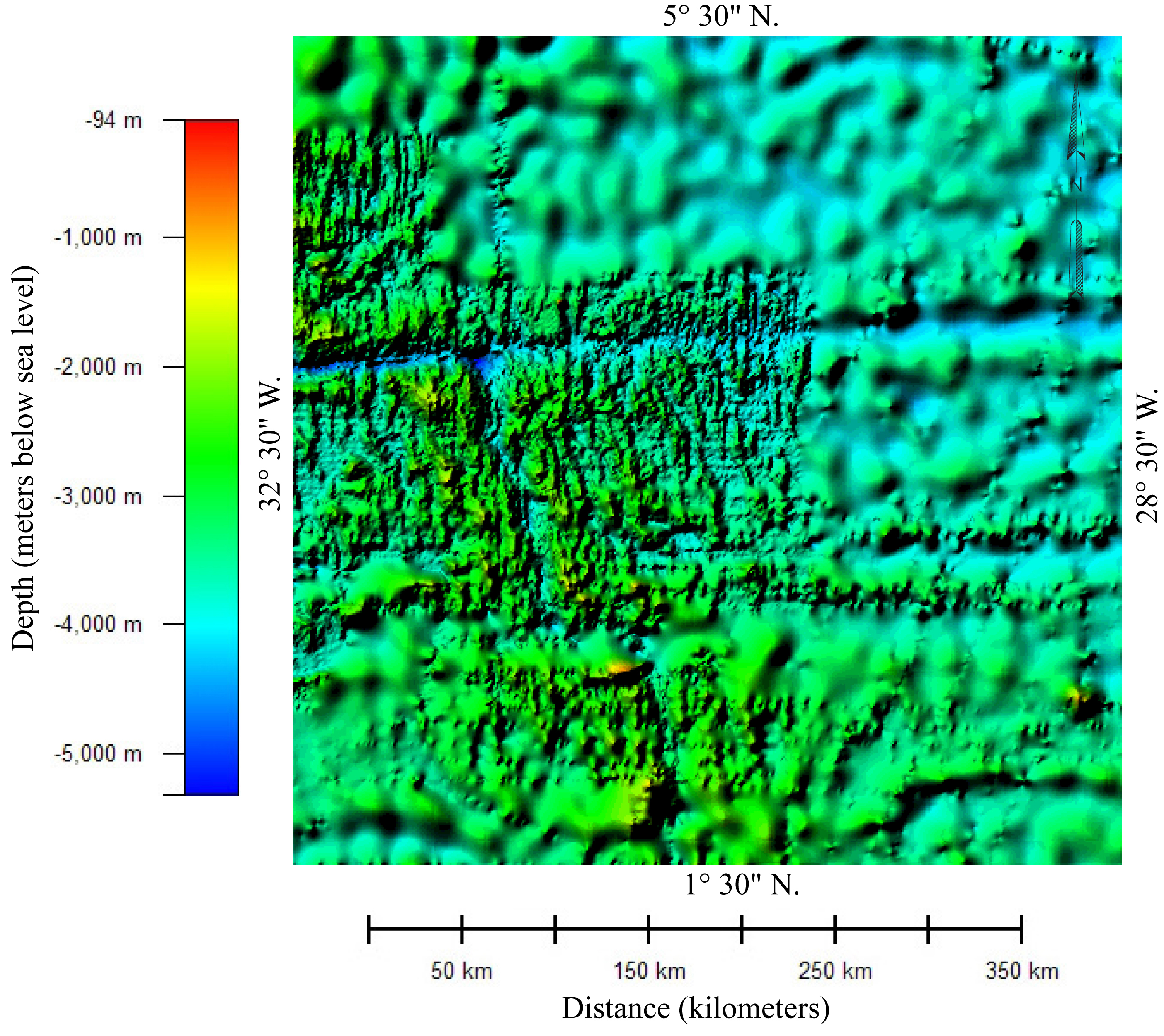
Colour bathymetry relief map of the part of Atlantic Ocean into which Air France Flight 447 crashed. Image shows two different data sets with different resolution. (Note: The areas showing detailed bathymetry were mapped using multibeam bathymetric sonar. The areas showing very generalized bathymetry were mapped using high-density satellite altimetry.)

Following the end of the search for bodies, the search continued for the Airbus's "black boxes"—the Cockpit Voice Recorder (CVR) and the Flight Data Recorder (FDR). French Bureau of Enquiry and Analysis for Civil Aviation Safety (BEA) chief Paul-Louis Arslanian said that he was not optimistic about finding them since they might have been under as much as 3,000 metres (10,000 ft) of water, and the terrain under this portion of the ocean was very rugged. Investigators were hoping to find the aircraft's lower aft section, for that was where the recorders were located. Although France had never recovered a flight recorder from such depths, there was precedent for such an operation: in 1988, an independent contractor recovered the CVR of South African Airways Flight 295 from a depth of 4,900 metres (16,100 ft) in a search area of between 270 and 860 square kilometres (110 and 330 mi^{2}; 80 and 250 sq nmi). The Air France flight recorders were fitted with water-activated acoustic underwater locator beacons or "pingers", which should have remained active for at least 30 days, giving searchers that much time to locate the origin of the signals.

France requested two "towed pinger locator hydrophones" from the United States Navy to help find the aircraft. The French nuclear submarine and two French-contracted ships (the Fairmount Expedition and the Fairmount Glacier, towing the U.S. Navy listening devices) trawled a search area with a radius of 80 kilometres (50 mi), centred on the aircraft's last known position. By mid-July, recovery of the black boxes still had not been announced. The finite beacon battery life meant that, as the time since the crash elapsed, the likelihood of location diminished. In late July, the search for the black boxes entered its second phase, with a French research vessel resuming the search using a towed sonar array. The second phase of the search ended on 20 August without finding wreckage within a 75 kilometres (47 mi; 40 nmi) radius of the last position, as reported at 02:10.

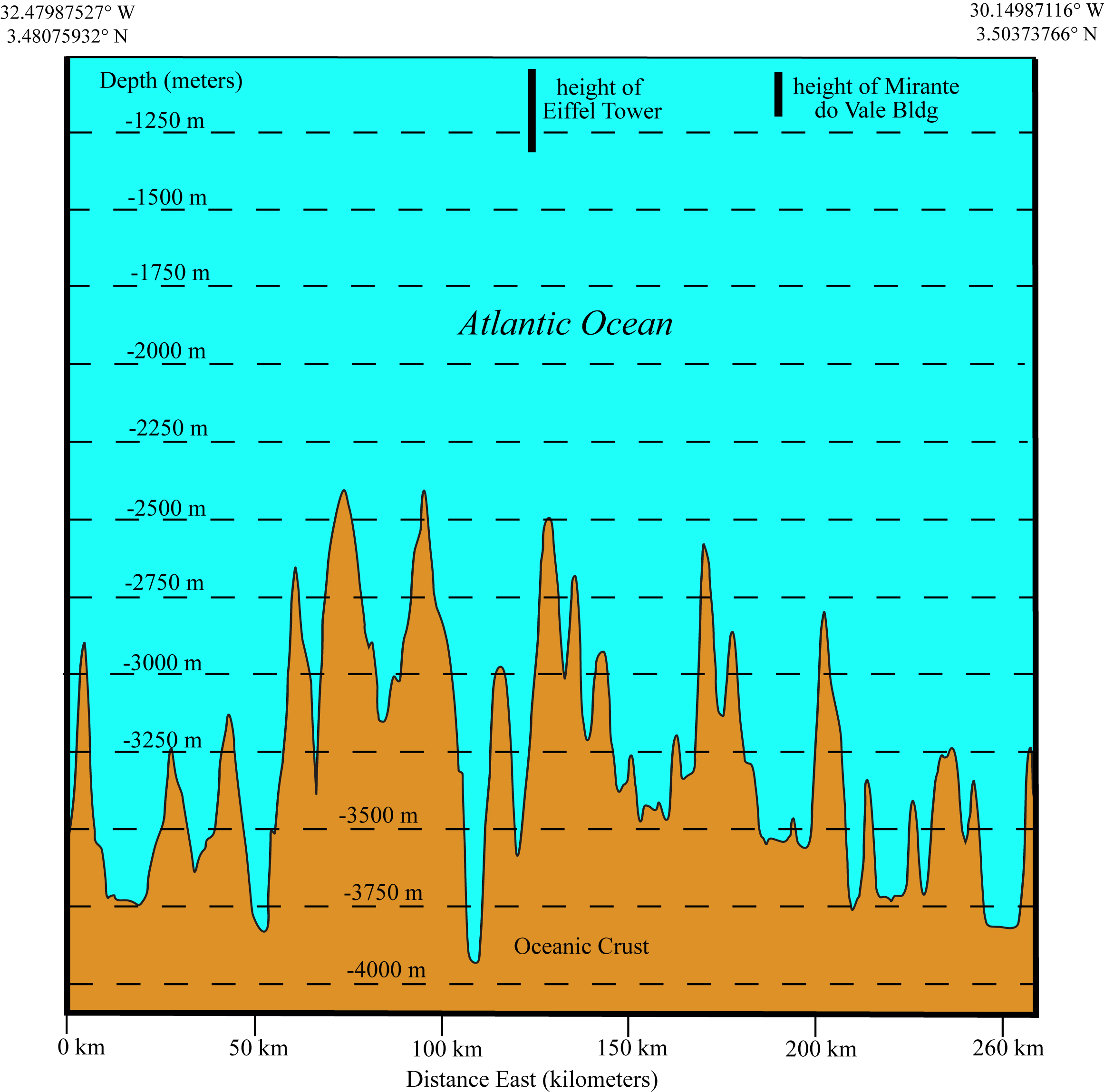
East-west cross-section of Atlantic Ocean portion in which Air France Flight 447 crashed, showing depth of the sea floor. The vertical scale is exaggerated by a factor of 100 relative to the horizontal.

The third phase of the search for the recorders lasted from 2 April until 24 May 2010, and was conducted by two ships, the Anne Candies and the Seabed Worker. The Anne Candies towed a U.S. Navy sonar array, while the Seabed Worker operated three AUV ABYSS (a REMUS AUV type) robot submarines. Air France and Airbus jointly funded the third phase of the search. The search covered an area of 6,300 square kilometres (2,400 sq mi; 1,800 sq nmi), mostly to the north and north-west of the aircraft's last known position. The search area had been drawn up by oceanographers from France, Russia, Great Britain and the United States combining data on the location of floating bodies and wreckage, and currents in the mid-Atlantic in the days immediately after the crash. A smaller area to the south-west was also searched, based on a re-analysis of sonar recordings made by Émeraude the previous year. The third phase of the search ended on 24 May 2010 without any success, though the BEA says that the search 'nearly' covered the whole area drawn up by investigators.

=== 2011 search and recovery ===
In July 2010, the U.S.-based search consultancy Metron, Inc., had been engaged to draw up a probability map of where to focus the search, based on prior probabilities from flight data and local condition reports, combined with the results from the previous searches. The Metron team used what it described as "classic" Bayesian search methods, an approach that had previously been successful in the search for the submarine USS Scorpion and SS Central America. Phase 4 of the search operation started close to the aircraft's last known position, which was identified by the Metron study as being the most likely resting place of Flight 447.

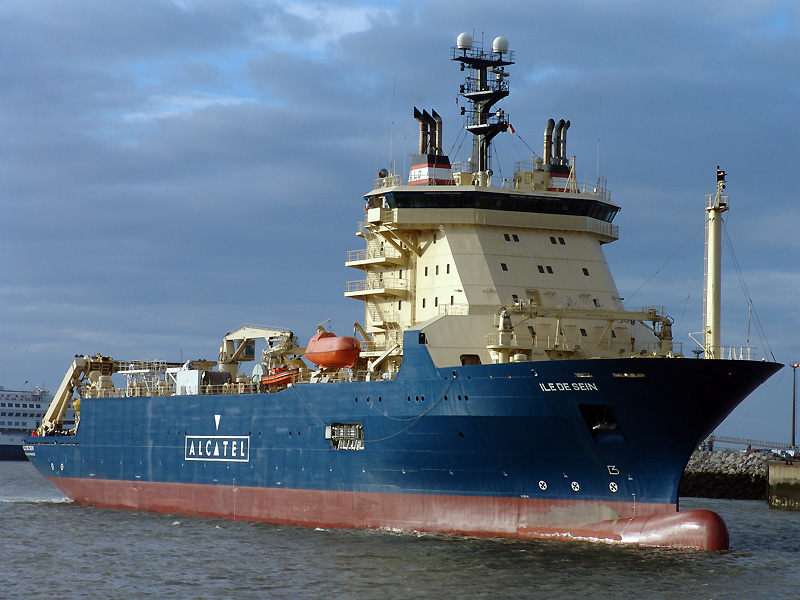
Cable ship Île de Sein was assigned to assist in the recovery of materials from the ocean floor.

Within a week of resuming the search operation, on 3 April 2011, a team led by the Woods Hole Oceanographic Institution operating full ocean depth autonomous underwater vehicles (AUVs) owned by the Waitt Institute discovered, by means of sidescan sonar, a large portion of the debris field from flight AF447. Further debris and bodies, still trapped in the partly intact remains of the aircraft's fuselage, were at a depth of 3,980 metres (2,180 fathoms; 13,060 ft). The debris was found lying in a relatively flat and silty area of the ocean floor (as opposed to the extremely mountainous topography originally believed to be AF447's final resting place). Other items found were engines, wing parts and the landing gear.

The debris field was described as "quite compact", measuring 200 by 600 metres (700 by 2,000 ft) and a short distance north of where pieces of wreckage had been recovered previously, suggesting the aircraft hit the water largely intact. The French Ecology and Transportation Minister Nathalie Kosciusko-Morizet stated the bodies and wreckage would be brought to the surface and taken to France for examination and identification. The French government chartered the Île de Sein to recover the flight recorders from the wreckage. An American Remora 6000 remotely operated vehicle (ROV) (Note: The Remora 6000 remotely operated vehicle was designed and constructed by Phoenix International Holdings, Inc. of Largo, Maryland, United States.) and operations crew from Phoenix International experienced in the recovery of aircraft for the United States Navy were on board the Île de Sein.

Île de Sein arrived at the crash site on 26 April, and during its first dive, the Remora 6000 found the flight data recorder chassis, although without the crash-survivable memory unit. On 1 May the memory unit was found and lifted on board the Île de Sein by the ROV. The aircraft's cockpit voice recorder was found on 2 May 2011, and was raised and brought on board the Île de Sein the following day.

On 7 May, the flight recorders, under judicial seal, were taken aboard the French Navy patrol boat La Capricieuse for transfer to the port of Cayenne. From there they were transported by air to the BEA's office in Le Bourget near Paris for data download and analysis. One engine and the avionics bay, containing onboard computers, had also been raised.

By 15 May, all the data from both the flight data recorder and the cockpit voice recorder had been downloaded. The data was analysed over the following weeks, and the findings published in the third interim report at the end of July. The entire download was filmed and recorded.

Between 5 May and 3 June 2011, 104 bodies were recovered from the wreckage, bringing the total number of bodies found to 154. Fifty bodies had been previously recovered from the sea. The search ended with the remaining 74 bodies still not recovered.

== Investigation and safety improvements ==
The French authorities opened two investigations. A criminal investigation for manslaughter began on 5 June 2009, under the supervision of Investigating Magistrate Sylvie Zimmerman from the Paris High Court (French: Tribunal de Grande Instance). The judge gave the investigation to the National Gendarmerie (French: Gendarmerie nationale), which would conduct it through its aerial transportation division (Air transport police, French: Gendarmerie des transports aériens or GTA) and its forensic research institute (the National Gendarmerie Institute for Criminal Research, French: Institut de recherche criminelle de la gendarmerie nationale). As part of the criminal investigation, the DGSE (the external French intelligence agency) examined the names of passengers on board for any possible links to terrorist groups. In March 2011, a French judge filed preliminary manslaughter charges against Air France and Airbus over the crash. The cases against Air France and Airbus were dropped in 2019 and 2021 respectively.

A technical investigation was started, the goal of which was to enhance the safety of future flights. In accordance with the provisions of ICAO Annex 13, the BEA participated in the investigation as representative for the state (country) of manufacture of the Airbus. The Brazilian Air Force's Aeronautical Accidents Investigation and Prevention Center (CENIPA), the German Federal Bureau of Aircraft Accident Investigation (BFU), the UK's Air Accidents Investigation Branch (AAIB), and the U.S. National Transportation Safety Board (NTSB) also became involved in accordance with these provisions; the NTSB became involved as the representative of the state of manufacture of the General Electric turbine engines installed on the aircraft, and the other representatives could supply important information. The People's Republic of China, Croatia, Hungary, Republic of Ireland, Italy, Lebanon, Morocco, Norway, South Korea, Russia, South Africa, and Switzerland appointed observers, since citizens of those countries were on board.

On 5 June 2009, the BEA cautioned against premature speculation as to the cause of the crash. At that time, the investigation had established only two facts—the weather near the aircraft's planned route included significant convective cells typical of the equatorial regions, and the speeds measured by the three pitot tubes differed from each other during the last few minutes of the flight.

On 2 July 2009, the BEA released an intermediate report, which described all known facts, and a summary of the visual examination of the rudder and the other parts of the aircraft that had been recovered at that time. According to the BEA, this examination showed:

- The airliner was likely to have struck the surface of the sea in a normal flight attitude, with a high rate of descent; (Note: The airliner was considered to be in a nearly level attitude, but with a high rate of descent when it collided with the surface of the ocean. That impact caused high deceleration and compression forces on the airliner, as shown by the deformations that were found in the recovered wreckage.)
- No signs of any fires or explosions were found.
- The airliner did not break up in flight. The report also stresses that the BEA had not had access to the post mortem reports at the time of its writing.

On 16 May 2011, Le Figaro reported that the BEA investigators had ruled out an aircraft malfunction as the cause of the crash, according to preliminary information extracted from the FDR. The following day, the BEA issued a press release explicitly describing the Le Figaro report as a "sensationalist publication of non-validated information". The BEA stated that no conclusions had been made, investigations were continuing, and no interim report was expected before the summer. On 18 May, the head of the investigation further stated no major malfunction of the aircraft had been found so far in the data from the flight data recorder, but that minor malfunctions had not been ruled out.

=== Airspeed inconsistency ===
In the minutes before its disappearance, the aircraft's onboard systems sent a number of messages via the ACARS indicating disagreement in the indicated airspeed readings. A spokesperson for the BEA stated, "the airspeed of the aircraft was unclear" to the pilots and, on 4 June 2009, Airbus issued an Accident Information Telex to operators of all its aircraft reminding pilots of the recommended abnormal and emergency procedures to be taken in the case of unreliable airspeed indication. French transport minister Dominique Bussereau said, "Obviously, the pilots [of Flight 447] did not have the [correct] speed showing, which can lead to two bad consequences for the life of the aircraft: under-speed, which can lead to a stall, and over-speed, which can lead to the aircraft breaking up because it is approaching the speed of sound and the structure of the plane is not made for resisting such speeds".

==== Pitot tubes ====
Between May 2008 and March 2009, nine incidents involving the temporary loss of airspeed indication appeared in the air safety reports (ASRs) for Air France's A330/A340 fleet. All occurred in cruise between flight levels FL310 and FL380. Further, after the Flight 447 accident, Air France identified six additional incidents that had not been reported on ASRs. These were intended for maintenance aircraft technical logs drawn up by the pilots to describe these incidents only partially, to indicate the characteristic symptoms of the incidents associated with unreliable airspeed readings. The problems primarily occurred in 2007 on the A320, but awaiting a recommendation from Airbus, Air France delayed installing new pitot tubes on A330/A340 and increased inspection frequencies in these aircraft.

When it was introduced in 1994, the Airbus A330 was equipped with pitot tubes, part number 0851GR, manufactured by Goodrich Sensors and Integrated Systems. A 2001 Airworthiness Directive (AD) required these to be replaced with either a later Goodrich design, part number 0851HL, or with pitot tubes made by Thales, part number C16195AA. Air France chose to equip its fleet with the Thales pitot tubes. In September 2007, Airbus recommended that Thales C16195AA pitot tubes should be replaced by Thales model C16195BA to address the problem of water ingress that had been observed. Since it was not an AD, the guidelines allowed the operator to apply the recommendations at its discretion. Air France implemented the change on its A320 fleet, on which the incidents of water ingress were observed, and decided to do so in its A330/340 fleet only when failures started to occur in May 2008.

After discussing these issues with the manufacturer, Air France sought a means of reducing these incidents, and Airbus indicated that the new pitot probe designed for the A320 was not designed to prevent cruise-level ice-over. In 2009, tests suggested that the new probe could improve its reliability, prompting Air France to accelerate the replacement program, which started on 29 May. F-GZCP was scheduled to have its pitot tubes replaced as soon as it returned to Paris. By 17 June 2009, Air France had replaced all pitot probes on its A330 type aircraft.

In July 2009, Airbus issued new advice to A330 and A340 operators to exchange Thales pitot tubes for tubes from Goodrich. This was followed on 12 August by three mandatory service bulletins applying to all A330 and A340 aircraft. These required that two of the three tubes be Goodrich 0851HL with the third being either the same or Thales C16195BA. Thales C16195AA tubes were no longer to be used. This was incorporated into ADs issued by the EASA on 31 August and the FAA on 3 September with the FAA requiring that replacement be completed within 120 days of the effective date. The ADs stated that reports of airspeed indication discrepancies while flying at high altitudes in inclement weather conditions were attributable to the model of tube being replaced having a greater susceptibility to adverse environmental conditions, and further noted that the new Thales model had not yet demonstrated the same level of robustness.

On 20 December 2010, Airbus issued a warning to roughly 100 operators of A330, A340-200, and A340-300 aircraft regarding pitot tubes, advising pilots not to re-engage the autopilot following failure of the airspeed indicators. Safety recommendations issued by BEA for pitot probes design, recommended, "they must be fitted with a heating system designed to prevent any malfunctioning due to icing. Appropriate means must be provided (visual warning directly visible to the crew) to inform the crew of any nonfunctioning of the heating system".

=== Findings from the flight data recorder ===
On 27 May 2011, the BEA released an update on its investigation describing the history of the flight as recorded by the FDR. This confirmed what had previously been concluded from post mortem examination of the bodies and debris recovered from the ocean surface; the aircraft had not broken up at altitude, but had fallen into the ocean intact. The FDRs also revealed that the aircraft's descent into the sea was not due to mechanical failure or the aircraft being overwhelmed by the weather, but because the flight crew had raised the aircraft's nose, reducing its speed until it entered an aerodynamic stall.

While the inconsistent airspeed data caused the disengagement of the autopilot, the reason the pilots lost control of the aircraft had remained a mystery, in particular because pilots would normally try to lower the nose in the event of a stall. Multiple sensors provide the pitch information and no indication was given that any of them were malfunctioning. One factor may be that since the A330 does not normally accept control inputs that would cause a stall, the pilots were unaware that a stall could happen when the aircraft switched to an alternative mode because of failure of the airspeed indication. (Note: Some reports have described this as a deep stall, but this was a steady state conventional stall. A deep stall is associated with an aircraft with a T-tail, but this aircraft does not have a T-tail. The BEA described it as a "sustained stall".)

In October 2011, a transcript of the CVR was leaked and published in the book Erreurs de Pilotage (Pilot Errors) by Jean Pierre Otelli. The BEA and Air France both condemned the release of this information, with Air France calling it "sensationalized and unverifiable information" that "impairs the memory of the crew and passengers who lost their lives." The BEA subsequently released its final report on the accident, and Appendix 1 contained an official CVR transcript that did not include groups of words deemed to have no bearing on flight.

Leaked transcript of cockpit voice recorder
| Time | Speaker | French | English translation |
|---|---|---|---|
| 02:02:00 | The captain leaves the flight deck to take a nap, leaving the considerably lesser experienced of the two co-pilots in command. | | |
| 02:03:44 | Bonin (Right seat) | La convergence inter tropicale… voilà, là on est dedans, entre SALPU et TASIL. Et puis, voilà, on est en plein dedans… | The inter-tropical convergence... look, we're in it, between [waypoints] SALPU and TASIL. And then, look, we're right in it... |
| 02:05:55 | Robert (Left seat) | Oui, on va les appeler derrière... pour leur dire quand même parce que... | Yes, let's call them in the back, to let them know anyway, because... |
| 02:05:59 | Purser | Oui? Maryline. | Yes? Maryline here. |
| 02:06:04 | Bonin | Oui, Maryline, c'est Pierre devant... Dis-moi, dans deux minutes, on devrait attaquer une zone où ça devrait bouger un peu plus que maintenant. Il faudrait vous méfier là. | Yeah, Maryline - it's Pierre up front... Listen, in two minutes, we're going to be getting into an area where things are going to be moving around a little bit more than now. You'll want to take care. |
| 02:06:13 | Purser | D'accord, on s'assoit alors? | Okay, we should sit down then? |
| 02:06:15 | Bonin | Bon, je pense que ce serait pas mal… tu préviens les copains! | Well, I think that's not a bad idea. Give your friends a heads-up. |
| 02:06:18 | Purser | Ouais, OK, j'appelle les autres derrière. Merci beaucoup. | Yeah, okay, I'll tell the others in the back. Thanks a lot. |
| 02:06:19 | Bonin | Mais je te rappelle dès qu'on est sorti de là. | I'll call you back as soon as we're out of it. |
| 02:06:20 | Purser | OK | OK |
| 02:06:50 | Bonin | Va pour les anti-ice. C'est toujours ça de pris. | Let's go for the anti-icing system. It's better than nothing. |
| 02:07:00 | Bonin | On est apparemment à la limite de la couche, ça devrait aller. | We seem to be at the end of the cloud layer, it might be okay. |
| 02:08:03 | Robert | Tu peux éventuellement le tirer un peu à gauche. | You can possibly pull it a little to the left. |
| 02:08:05 | Bonin | Excuse-moi? | Sorry, what? |
| 02:08:07 | Robert | Tu peux éventuellement prendre un peu à gauche. On est d'accord qu'on est en manuel, hein? | You can possibly pull it a little to the left. We're agreed that we're in manual, yeah? |
An audio alert sounds indicating that the autopilot has disconnected (because the pitot tubes have iced over).
| 02:10:06 | Bonin | J'ai les commandes. | I have the controls. |
| 02:10:07 | Robert | D'accord. | Okay. |
Bonin takes the aircraft into a steep climb; A chime alerts the crew that they are leaving their designated altitude. This is followed by a stall warning and a loud warning sound called a "cricket".
| 02:10:07 | Robert | Qu'est-ce que c'est que ça? | What's this? |
| 02:10:15 | Bonin | On n'a pas une bonne… On n'a pas une bonne annonce de vitesse. | There's no good... there's no good speed indication. |
| 02:10:16 | Robert | On a perdu les, les, les vitesses alors? | We've lost the, the, the speeds, then? |
The aircraft is climbing at 7,000 ft per minute, slowing all the time until its speed is only 93 knots (172 km/h)
| 02:10:27 | Robert | Faites attention à ta vitesse. Faites attention à ta vitesse. | Pay attention to your speed. Pay attention to your speed. |
| 02:10:28 | Bonin | OK, OK, je redescends. | Okay, okay, I'm descending. |
| 02:10:30 | Robert | Tu stabilises... | Stabilize it... |
| 02:10:31 | Bonin | Ouais. | Yeah. |
| 02:10:31 | Robert | Tu redescends... On est en train de monter selon lui… Selon lui, tu montes, donc tu redescends. | Bring it down... It says we're going up... It says we're going up, so descend. |
| 02:10:35 | Bonin | D'accord. | Okay. |
As the de-icing system takes effect, one of the pitot tubes starts working again, and the cockpit displays again show correct speed information
| 02:10:36 | Robert | Redescends! | Get it down! |
| 02:10:37 | Bonin | C'est parti, on redescend. | Here we go, we're descending. |
| 02:10:38 | Robert | Doucement! | Gently! |
Bonin decreases his backward pressure on the stick, and stall warnings stop as the airspeed increases
| 02:10:41 | Bonin | On est en… ouais, on est en "climb." | We're... yeah, we're climbing. |
Bonin does not push the nose down. Robert presses a button to call the captain.
| 02:10:49 | Robert | Putain, il est où... euh? | Son of a bitch, where is he? |
| 02:10:55 | Robert | Putain! | Damn it! |
The other pitot tube starts working again; all aircraft systems are once again functional, and the pilots simply have to push the nose down to recover the aircraft from its stall.
| 02:11:03 | Bonin | Je suis en TOGA, hein? | I'm in TOGA [Takeoff/Go-around mode], huh? |
Bonin is attempting to increase speed and climb as if taking off or aborting a landing, but he is at 37,500 ft where this maneuver is inappropriate.
| 02:11:06 | Robert | Putain, il vient ou il vient pas? | Damn it, is he coming or isn't he? |
The aircraft reaches its maximum altitude; with the nose up at 18 degrees, it begins to descend.
| 02:11:21 | Robert | On a pourtant les moteurs! Qu'est-ce qui se passe bordel? Je ne comprends pas ce que se passe. | We still have the engines! What the hell is happening? I don't understand what's going on. |
Crew resource management fails as Robert is unaware that Bonin is still pulling back hard on his stick as the two pilots' controls are not physically linked so that they would move together. Buffeting as the aircraft is falling makes it difficult to keep the wings level.
| 02:11:32 | Bonin | Putain, j'ai plus le contrôle de l'avion, là! J'ai plus le contrôle de l'avion! | Son of a bitch, I don't have control of the aircraft, I don't have control of the aircraft at all! |
| 02:11:37 | Robert | Commandes à gauche! | Control to the left! |
The more senior co-pilot briefly takes control, but is unaware that the aircraft has stalled. Bonin retakes control as the captain returns.
| 02:11:43 | Captain | Eh… Qu'est-ce que vous foutez? | Eh... What are you up to? |
| 02:11:45 | Bonin | On perd le contrôle de l'avion, là! | We've lost control of the aircraft! |
| 02:11:47 | Robert | On a totalement perdu le contrôle de l'avion... On comprend rien... On a tout tenté... | We've totally lost control of the aircraft. We don't understand at all... We've tried everything |
The aircraft is back at the correct altitude, but falling at 10,000 ft per minute with an angle of attack of 41 degrees. The pitot tubes are functional, but as the speed has fallen below 60 knots (110 km/h) and the angle of attack is too great, the data is considered invalid and the stall warnings stop.
| 02:12:14 | Robert | Qu'est-ce que tu en penses? Qu'est-ce que tu en penses? Qu'est-ce qu'il faut faire? | What do you think? What do you think? What should we do? |
| 02:12:15 | Captain | Alors, là, je ne sais pas! | Well, I don't know! |
The captain urges Bonin to level the wings, which does not address the primary issue of the stall. The men discuss whether they are climbing or descending, before agreeing that they are indeed descending. As the aircraft approaches 10,000 feet, Robert tries to take back the controls, and pushes forward on the stick, however in "dual input" mode, the flight system averages his inputs with those of Bonin, who is still pulling back. The nose therefore remains up.
| 02:13:40 | Robert | Remonte... remonte... remonte... remonte... | Climb... climb... climb... climb... |
Bonin communicates for the first time that he has been pulling the stick back all the time.
| 02:13:40 | Bonin | Mais je suis à fond à cabrer depuis tout à l'heure! | But I've had the stick back the whole time! |
| 02:13:42 | Captain | Non, non, non... Ne remonte pas... non, non. | No, no, no... Don't climb... no, no. |
| 02:13:43 | Robert | Alors descends... Alors, donne-moi les commandes... À moi les commandes! | Then go down... Look, give me the controls... Give the controls to me! |
Bonin relinquishes control to Robert who for the first time is able to push the nose down to gather speed. A ground proximity warning sounds at 2,000 ft, and Bonin once again starts to pull back on the stick.
| 02:14:23 | Robert | Putain, on va taper... C'est pas vrai! | Son of a bitch, we're going to crash... This can't be real! |
| 02:14:25 | Bonin | Mais qu'est-ce que se passe? | But what's going on? |
| 02:14:27 | Captain | 10 degrès d'assiette... | Ten degrees of pitch... |
End of recording

=== Third interim report ===
On 29 July 2011, the BEA released a third interim report on safety issues it found in the wake of the crash. It was accompanied by two shorter documents summarizing the interim report and addressing safety recommendations.

The third interim report stated that some new facts had been established. In particular:

- The pilots had not applied the unreliable-airspeed procedure.
- The pilot-in-control pulled back on the stick, increasing the angle of attack and causing the aircraft to climb rapidly.
- The pilots apparently did not notice that the aircraft had reached its maximum permissible altitude.
- The pilots did not read out the available data (vertical velocity, altitude, etc.).
- The stall warning sounded continuously for 54 seconds.
- The pilots did not comment on the stall warnings and apparently did not realize that the aircraft was stalled.
- There was some buffeting associated with the stall.
- The stall warning deactivates by design when the angle of attack measurements are considered invalid, as is the case when the measured speed drops below a certain value.
- In consequence, the stall warning came on whenever the pilot pushed forward on the stick and then stopped when he pulled back; this happened several times during the stall, and may have confused the pilots.
- Although they knew that altitude was declining rapidly, the pilots were unable to determine which instruments to trust; all values may have appeared to them to be incoherent.

The BEA assembled a human factors working group to analyze the crew's actions and reactions during the final stages of the flight.

A brief bulletin by Air France indicated, "the misleading stopping and starting of the stall-warning alarm, contradicting the actual state of the aircraft, greatly contributed to the crew's difficulty in analyzing the situation."

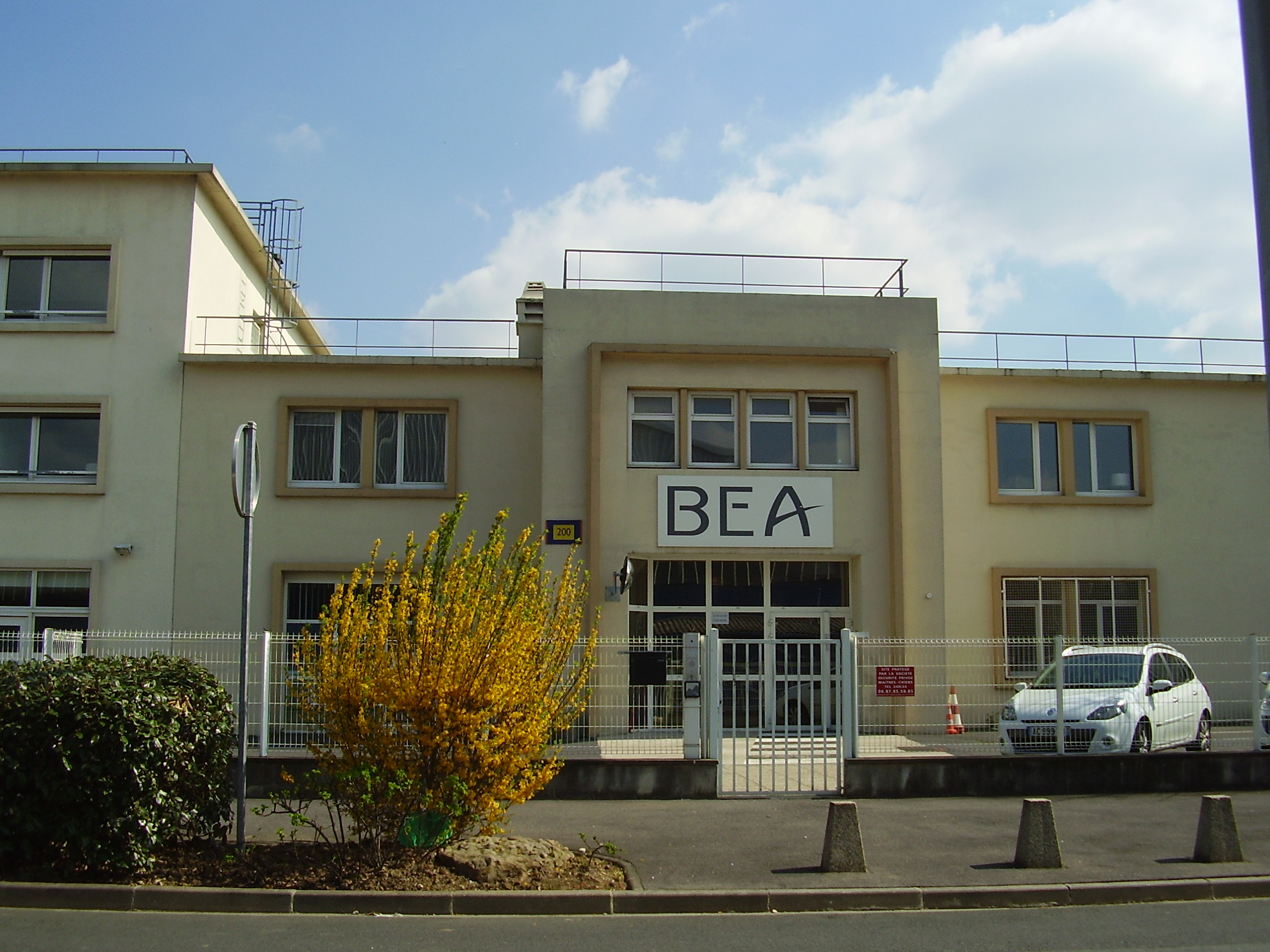
Building 153, the head office of the Bureau of Enquiry and Analysis for Civil Aviation Safety (BEA) at Le Bourget Airport, where the flight recorders were analysed

=== Final report ===
On 5 July 2012, the BEA released its final report on the accident. This confirmed the findings of the preliminary reports and provided additional details and recommendations to improve safety. According to the final report, the accident resulted from this succession of major events:

- Temporary inconsistency between the measured speeds, likely as a result of the obstruction of the pitot tubes by ice crystals, caused autopilot disconnection and [flight control mode] reconfiguration to "alternate law (ALT)".
- The crew made inappropriate control inputs that destabilized the flight path.
- The crew failed to follow appropriate procedure for loss of displayed airspeed information.
- The crew were late in identifying and correcting the deviation from the flight path.
- The crew lacked understanding of the approach to stall.
- The crew failed to recognize the aircraft had stalled, and consequently did not make inputs that would have made recovering from the stall possible.

These events resulted from these major factors in combination:

- Feedback mechanisms between all those involved (the report identifies manufacturers, operators, flight crews, and regulatory agencies), which made it impossible to identify repeated non-application of the loss of airspeed information procedure, and to ensure that crews were trained in icing of the pitot probes and its consequences.
- The crew's lack of practical training in manually handling the aircraft both at high altitude and in the event of anomalies of speed indication.
- The weakening of the two co-pilots' task sharing, both by incomprehension of the situation at the time of autopilot disconnection and by poor management of the "startle effect", leaving them in an emotionally charged state.
- The cockpit's lack of a clear display of the inconsistencies in airspeed readings identified by the flight computers.
- The crew's lack of response to the stall warning, whether due to a failure to identify the aural warning, to the transience of the stall warnings that could have been considered spurious, to the absence of any visual information that could confirm that the aircraft was approaching stall after losing the characteristic speeds, to confusing stall-related buffet for overspeed-related buffet, to the indications by the flight director that might have confirmed the crew's mistaken view of their actions, or to difficulty in identifying and understanding the implications of the switch to alternate law, which does not protect the angle of attack.

== Independent analyses ==
Before and after the publication of the final report by the BEA in July 2012, many independent analyses and expert opinions were published in the media about the cause of the accident.

=== Significance of the accident ===
In May 2011, Wil S. Hylton of The New York Times commented that the crash "was easy to bend into myth" because "no other passenger jet in modern history had disappeared so completely—without a Mayday call or a witness or even a trace on radar." Hylton explained that the A330 "was considered to be among the safest" of the passenger aircraft. Hylton added that when "Flight 447 seemed to disappear from the sky, it was tempting to deliver a tidy narrative about the hubris of building a self-flying aircraft, Icarus falling from the sky. Or maybe Flight 447 was the Titanic, an uncrashable ship at the bottom of the sea." Guy Gratton, an aviation expert from the Flight Safety Laboratory at Brunel University, said, "This is an air accident the likes of which we haven't seen before. Half the accident investigators in the Western world—and in Russia too—are waiting for these results. This has been the biggest investigation since Lockerbie. Put bluntly, big passenger planes do not just fall out of the sky."

=== Angle-of-attack indication ===
Chesley "Sully" Sullenberger suggested that pilots would be able to better handle upsets of this type if they had an indication of the wing's angle of attack (AoA). By contrast, aviation author Captain Bill Palmer has expressed doubts that an AoA indicator would have saved AF447, writing: "as the pilot flying (PF) seemed to be ignoring the more fundamental indicators of pitch and attitude, along with numerous stall warnings, one could question what difference a rarely used AoA gauge would have made".

Following its investigation, the BEA recommended that the European Aviation Safety Agency and the FAA should consider making an AoA indicator on the instrument panel mandatory. In 2014, the FAA streamlined requirements for AoA indicators for general aviation without affecting requirements for commercial aviation.

=== Human factors and computer interaction ===
On 6 December 2011, Popular Mechanics published an English translation of the analysis of the transcript of the CVR controversially leaked in the book Erreurs de Pilotage. It highlighted the role of the co-pilot in stalling the aircraft, while the flight computer was under alternate law at high altitude. This "simple but persistent" human error was given as the most direct cause of this accident. In the commentary accompanying the article, they also noted that the failure to follow principles of crew resource management was a contributory factor.

The final BEA report points to the human-computer interface (HCI) of the Airbus as a possible factor contributing to the crash. It provides an explanation for most of the pitch-up inputs by the pilot flying, left unexplained in the Popular Mechanics piece: namely that the flight director display was misleading. The pitch-up input at the beginning of the fatal sequence of events appears to be the consequence of an altimeter error. The investigators also pointed to the lack of a clear display of the airspeed inconsistencies, though the computers had identified them. Some systems generated failure messages only about the consequences, but never mentioned the origin of the problem. The investigators recommended a blocked pitot tube should be clearly indicated as such to the crew on the flight displays. The Daily Telegraph pointed out the absence of AoA information, which is important in identifying and preventing a stall. The paper stated, "though angle of attack readings are sent to onboard computers, there are no displays in modern jets to convey this critical information to the crews." Der Spiegel indicated the difficulty the pilots faced in diagnosing the problem: "One alarm after another lit up the cockpit monitors. One after another, the autopilot, the automatic engine control system, and the flight computers shut themselves off." Against this backdrop of confusing information, difficulty with aural cognition (due to heavy buffeting from the storm, as well as the stall) and zero external visibility, the pilots had less than three minutes to identify the problem and take corrective action. Der Spiegel concluded that such a crash "could happen again".

In an article in Vanity Fair, William Langewiesche noted that once the AoA was so extreme, the system rejected the data as invalid, and temporarily stopped the stall warnings, but "this led to a perverse reversal that lasted nearly to the impact; each time Bonin happened to lower the nose, rendering the angle of attack marginally less severe, the stall warning sounded again—a negative reinforcement that may have locked him into his pattern of pitching up", which increased the angle of attack and thus aggravated the stall.

==== Side-stick control issue ====
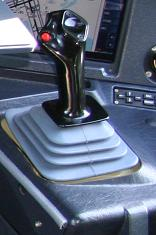
Right-hand side-stick control on an Airbus A380 flight deck (similar to the one installed on A330s)

In April 2012 in The Daily Telegraph, British journalist Nick Ross published a comparison of Airbus and Boeing flight controls; unlike the control yoke used on Boeing flight decks, the Airbus side-stick controls give little visual feedback and no sensory or tactile feedback to the second pilot. The cockpit synthetic voice, however, does give an aural 'Dual Input' warning, but only in the absence of higher priority warnings, whenever both pilots move their side-sticks. Ross reasoned that the lack of the dual control warning might in part explain why the pilot flying's fatal nose-up inputs were not countermanded by his two colleagues.

In a July 2012 CBS report, Sullenberger suggested the design of the Airbus cockpit might have been a factor in the accident. The flight controls are not mechanically linked between the two pilot seats, and Robert, the left-seat pilot who believed he had taken over control of the aircraft, was not aware that Bonin continued to hold the stick back, which overrode Robert's own control. (Note: There was a similar side-stick control issue in the Air Asia Flight 8501 accident.)

The BEA final report acknowledged the difficulty for one pilot to observe the side-stick input of the other, but did not identify it as a cause of the accident and made no recommendation related to the side-stick input design.

=== Fatigue ===
Getting enough sleep is a constant concern for pilots of long-haul flights. Although the BEA could find no "objective" indications that the pilots of Flight 447 were suffering from fatigue, some exchanges recorded on the CVR, including a remark made by Captain Dubois that he had only slept an hour, (Note: "I didn't sleep enough last night. One hour – it's not enough right now." "Cette nuit, j'ai pas assez dormi. Une heure, c'était pas assez tout à l'heure.") could indicate the crew were not well rested before the flight. The co-pilots had spent three nights in Rio de Janeiro, but the BEA was unable to retrieve data regarding their rest and could not determine their activities during the stopover.

== Aftermath ==
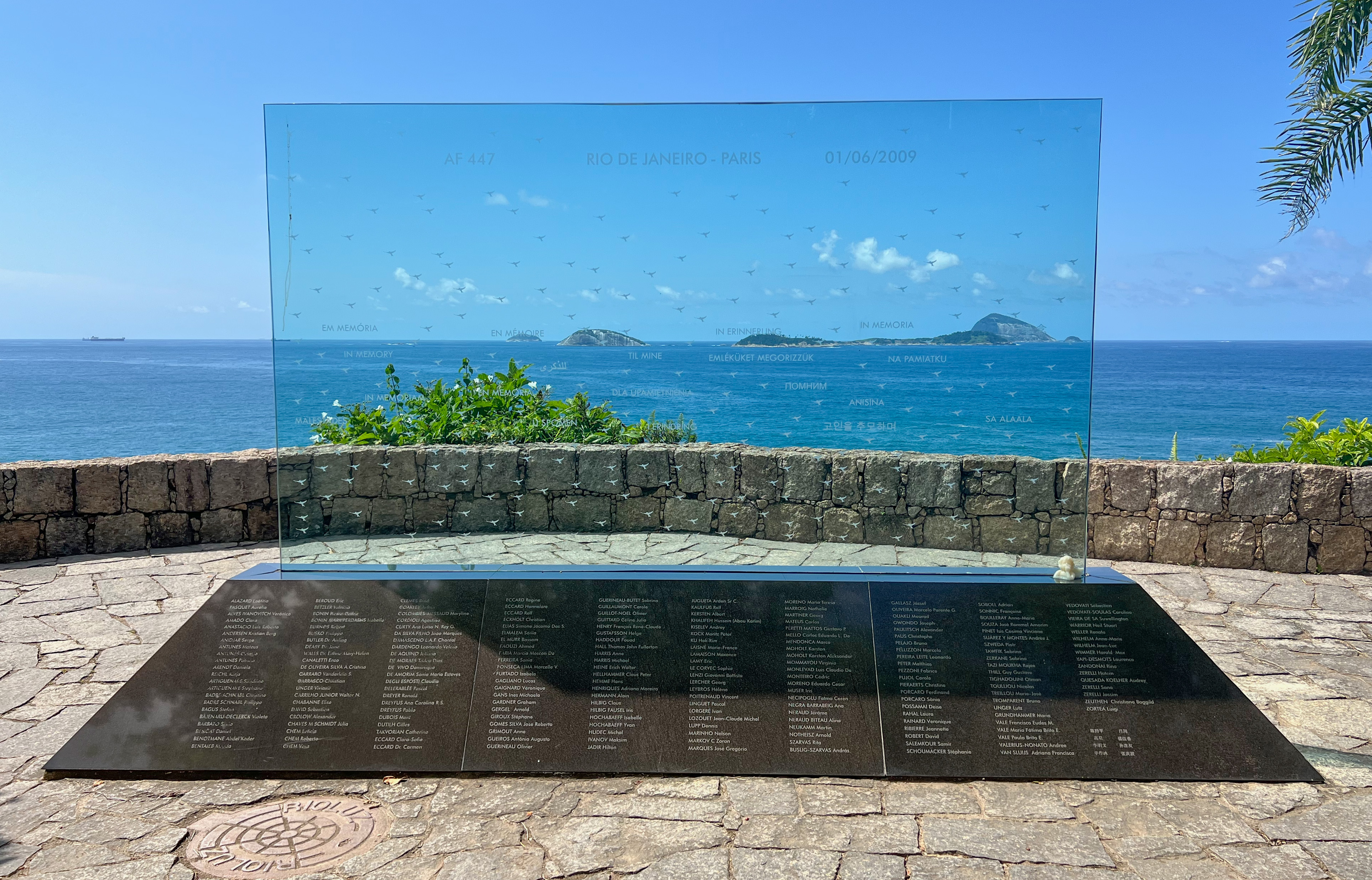
Memorial to the victims of Flight 447 in Rio. An identical monument was erected in Paris at Père Lachaise Cemetery.

Shortly after the crash, Air France changed the number of the regular Rio de Janeiro-Paris flight from AF447 to AF445; and, as of December 2023, the number for the route had been changed to AF485. Initially the Airbus A330 continued to operate the route, but the airline later switched to a Boeing 777-300ER.

Following the crash of Air France 447, other Airbus A330 operators studied their internal flight records to seek patterns. Delta Air Lines analyzed the data of Northwest Airlines flights that occurred before the two companies merged and found a dozen incidents in which at least one of an A330's pitot tubes had briefly stopped working when the aircraft was flying through the ITCZ, the same location where Air France 447 crashed.

=== Legal cases ===
Air France and Airbus have been investigated for manslaughter since 2011, but in 2019, prosecutors recommended dropping the case against Airbus and charging Air France with manslaughter and negligence, arguing, "the airline was aware of technical problems with a key airspeed monitoring instrument on its planes but failed to train pilots to resolve them". The case against Airbus was dropped on 22 July 2019. The case against Air France was dropped in September 2019 when magistrates said, "there were not enough grounds to prosecute". However, in 2021, a public prosecutor in Paris requested to have Airbus and Air France tried in a court of law. In April, it was announced that both companies would be prosecuted over the crash. Lawyers for Airbus stated they would lodge an immediate appeal against the decision. The trial opened on 10 October 2022, with Airbus and Air France both being charged with involuntary manslaughter. Both companies pleaded not guilty to the charges.

On 7 December, prosecutors announced that they would not seek conviction of either company for manslaughter as they were unable to prove them guilty, and recommended acquitting both companies. Families and friends of the victims were outraged by the decision. On 17 April 2023, Airbus and Air France were both acquitted of manslaughter. A French prosecutor lodged an appeal against the verdict.

The second trial opened on 29 September 2025. Airbus and Air France both pleaded not guilty to involuntary manslaughter a second time. On 21 May 2026 both companies were found guilty of corporate manslaughter. Each company was sentenced to pay the maximum fine of €225,000 ($261,112). Both companies plan to appeal the verdict.

== In popular culture ==
A one-hour documentary entitled Lost: The Mystery of Flight 447 detailing an early independent hypothesis about the crash was produced by Darlow Smithson in 2010 for Nova and the BBC. Without data from the black boxes, an independent panel of experts analyzed ACARS messages among weather patterns and limited debris data to postulate that supercooled water blocked pitot tubes, causing most automatic systems to shut down, before the information overload combined with auto-thrust not adjusting the indicated thrust level of the thrust levers caused crew to neglect increasing power, with automatic systems decreasing the capability of pilots to handle the stall.

On 16 September 2012, Channel 4 in the UK presented Fatal Flight 447: Chaos in the Cockpit, which showed data from the black boxes including an in-depth re-enactment. It was produced by Minnow Films. Similar presentation was made by 60 Minutes Australia in 2014.

The aviation-disaster documentary television series Mayday (also known as Air Crash Investigation and Air Emergency) produced a 45-minute episode titled "Air France 447: Vanished", which aired on 15 April 2013 in Great Britain and 17 May 2013 in the U.S.

An article about the crash by American author and pilot William Langewiesche, entitled "Should Airplanes Be Flying Themselves?", was published by Vanity Fair in October 2014.

A 99% Invisible podcast episode about the flight, entitled "Children of the Magenta (Automation Paradox, pt. 1)", was released on 23 June 2015 as the first of a two-part story about automation.

In November 2015, Massachusetts Institute of Technology professor David Mindell discussed the Air France Flight 447 tragedy in the opening segment of an EconTalk podcast dedicated to the ideas in Mindell's 2015 book Our Robots, Ourselves: Robotics and the Myths of Autonomy. Mindell said the crash illustrated a "failed handoff", with insufficient warning, from the aircraft's autopilot to the human pilots.

The Rooster Teeth–produced podcast Black Box Down covered the flight in an episode titled "Stalling 38,000 Feet Over The Atlantic" on 30 July 2020.

On 9 September 2021, the Science Channel Documentary Deadly Engineering covered the crash in Season 3 Episode 1: "Catastrophes in the Sky".

== See also ==
- Indonesia AirAsia Flight 8501, a 2014 fatal crash involving an Airbus A320 resulting from a high-altitude stall and pilots making opposite inputs with the aircraft's side-stick controls
- Colgan Air Flight 3407, a 2009 fatal crash resulting from an improper response to a stall by the pilot
- Birgenair Flight 301, a 1996 fatal crash resulting from blocked pitot tubes which led to a high-altitude stall
- Aeroperú Flight 603, a 1996 fatal crash caused by a blocked static port
- Airborne Express Flight 827, a 1996 fatal crash resulting from an improper response to a stall by the pilot
- Northwest Orient Airlines Flight 6231, a 1974 fatal crash caused by frozen pitot tubes
- XL Airways Germany Flight 888T, a 2008 fatal crash resulting from a stall that was caused by frozen angle-of-attack sensors
- Air Algérie Flight 5017, a 2014 fatal crash caused by ice accumulating in the engines and reducing thrust, which caused the aircraft to slow to the point of stalling
- Turkish Airlines Flight 5904, another flight that crashed because pilots improperly handled improper airspeed information due to frozen pitot tubes.
- TWA Flight 841 (1979) and China Airlines Flight 006, other accidents in which pilot errors led to stalls.
- List of deadliest aircraft accidents and incidents
- Air France accidents and incidents

== Works cited ==
Official sources (in English)

- BEA (France) (2 July 2009), Interim report on the accident on 1st June 2009 to the Airbus A330-203 registered F-GZCP operated by Air France flight AF 447 Rio de Janeiro – Paris (PDF), translated by BEA from French, Le Bourget: BEA Bureau of Enquiry and Analysis for Civil Aviation Safety, OCLC 821207217, archived (PDF) from the original on 30 May 2019
- BEA (France) (30 November 2009), Interim Report n°2 on the accident on 1st June 2009 to the Airbus A330-203 registered F-GZCP operated by Air France flight AF 447 Rio de Janeiro – Paris (PDF), translated by BEA from French, Le Bourget: BEA Bureau of Enquiry and Analysis for Civil Aviation Safety, ISBN 978-2-11-098715-0, OCLC 827738411, archived (PDF) from the original on 23 December 2022
- BEA (France) (29 July 2011), Interim report n °3 on the accident on 1st June 2009 to the Airbus A330-203 registered F-GZCP operated by Air France flight AF 447 Rio de Janeiro – Paris. (PDF), translated by BEA from French, Le Bourget: BEA Bureau of Enquiry and Analysis for Civil Aviation Safety, OCLC 827738487, archived (PDF) from the original on 23 December 2022
- BEA (France) (5 July 2012), Final report On the accident on 1st June 2009 to the Airbus A330-203 registered F-GZCP operated by Air France flight AF 447 Rio de Janeiro – Paris (PDF), translated by BEA from French, Le Bourget: BEA Bureau of Enquiry and Analysis for Civil Aviation Safety, archived (PDF) from the original on 30 May 2019
- BEA (France) (5 July 2012), "Appendix 1 CVR Transcript" (PDF), Final report On the accident on 1st June 2009 to the Airbus A330-203 registered F-GZCP operated by Air France flight AF 447 Rio de Janeiro – Paris, translated by BEA from French, Le Bourget: BEA Bureau of Enquiry and Analysis for Civil Aviation Safety, archived (PDF) from the original on 30 May 2019
- BEA (France) (5 July 2012), "Appendix 2 FDR Chronology" (PDF), Final report On the accident on 1st June 2009 to the Airbus A330-203 registered F-GZCP operated by Air France flight AF 447 Rio de Janeiro – Paris (PDF), translated by BEA from French, Le Bourget: BEA Bureau of Enquiry and Analysis for Civil Aviation Safety, archived (PDF) from the original on 30 May 2019

Official sources (in French) – the French version is the report of record.

- BEA (France) (2 July 2009), Accident survenu le 1er juin 2009 à l'Airbus A330-203 immatriculé F-GZCP exploité par Air France vol AF 447 Rio de Janeiro-Paris f-cp090601e : Rapport d'étape [Interim report on the accident on 1st June 2009 to the Airbus A330-203 registered F-GZCP operated by Air France flight AF 447 Rio de Janeiro – Paris] (PDF) (in French), Le Bourget: BEA Bureau of Enquiry and Analysis for Civil Aviation Safety, ISBN 978-2-11-098702-0, OCLC 816349880, archived (PDF) from the original on 30 May 2019
- BEA (France) (30 November 2009), Accident survenu le 1er juin 2009 à l'avion Airbus A330-203 immatriculé F-GZCP exploité par Air France Vol AF 447 Rio de Janeiro-Paris : rapport d'étape n° 2 [Interim Report n°2 on the accident on 1st June 2009 to the Airbus A330-203 registered F-GZCP operated by Air France flight AF 447 Rio de Janeiro – Paris] (PDF) (in French), Le Bourget: BEA Bureau of Enquiry and Analysis for Civil Aviation Safety, ISBN 978-2-11-098713-6, OCLC 762531678, archived (PDF) from the original on 10 October 2022
- BEA (France) (29 July 2011), Accident survenu le 1er juin 2009 à l'avion Airbus A330-203 immatriculé F-GZCP exploité par Air France Vol AF 447 Rio de Janeiro-Paris : rapport d'étape n° 3 [Interim Report n°3 on the accident on 1st June 2009 to the Airbus A330-203 registered F-GZCP operated by Air France flight AF 447 Rio de Janeiro – Paris] (PDF) (in French), Le Bourget: BEA Bureau of Enquiry and Analysis for Civil Aviation Safety, archived (PDF) from the original on 10 October 2022
- BEA (France) (5 July 2012), Accident survenu le 1er juin 2009 à l'Airbus A330-203 immatriculé F-GZCP exploité par Air France vol AF 447 Rio de Janeiro – Paris Rapport final [Final report On the accident on 1st June 2009 to the Airbus A330-203 registered F-GZCP operated by Air France flight AF 447 Rio de Janeiro – Paris] (PDF) (in French), Le Bourget: BEA Bureau of Enquiry and Analysis for Civil Aviation Safety, archived (PDF) from the original on 30 May 2019
- BEA (France) (5 July 2012), "Annexe 1 Transcription CVR" [Appendix 1 CVR Transcript] (PDF), Accident survenu le 1er juin 2009 à l'Airbus A330-203 immatriculé F-GZCP exploité par Air France vol AF 447 Rio de Janeiro – Paris [Accident survenu le 1er juin 2009 à l'Airbus A330-203 immatriculé F-GZCP exploité par Air France vol AF 447 Rio de Janeiro – Paris] (in French), Le Bourget: BEA Bureau of Enquiry and Analysis for Civil Aviation Safety, archived (PDF) from the original on 10 October 2022
- BEA (France) (5 July 2012), "Annexe 2 Chronologie FDR" [Appendix 2 FDR Chronology] (PDF), Accident survenu le 1er juin 2009 à l'Airbus A330-203 immatriculé F-GZCP exploité par Air France vol AF 447 Rio de Janeiro – Paris [Final report On the accident on 1st June 2009 to the Airbus A330-203 registered F-GZCP operated by Air France flight AF 447 Rio de Janeiro – Paris] (in French), Le Bourget: BEA Bureau of Enquiry and Analysis for Civil Aviation Safety, archived (PDF) from the original on 30 May 2019

Other sources

- Otelli, Jean-Pierre (2011). Erreurs de pilotage: Tome 5 [Pilot Error: Volume 5] (in French). Levallois-Perret: Altipresse. ISBN 979-10-90465-03-9. OCLC 780308849.
- Rapoport, Roger (2011). The Rio/Paris Crash: Air France 447. Lexographic Press. ISBN 978-0-9847142-0-9.
- Malmquist, Shem; Rapport, Roger (2017). Angle of Attack: Air France 447 and the future of Aviation Safety. Lexographic Press. ISBN 978-0-9847142-6-1.
- Palmer, Bill (2013). Understanding Air France 447 (paperback). William Palmer. ISBN 978-0989785723.
