= Wil S. Hylton =

American journalist

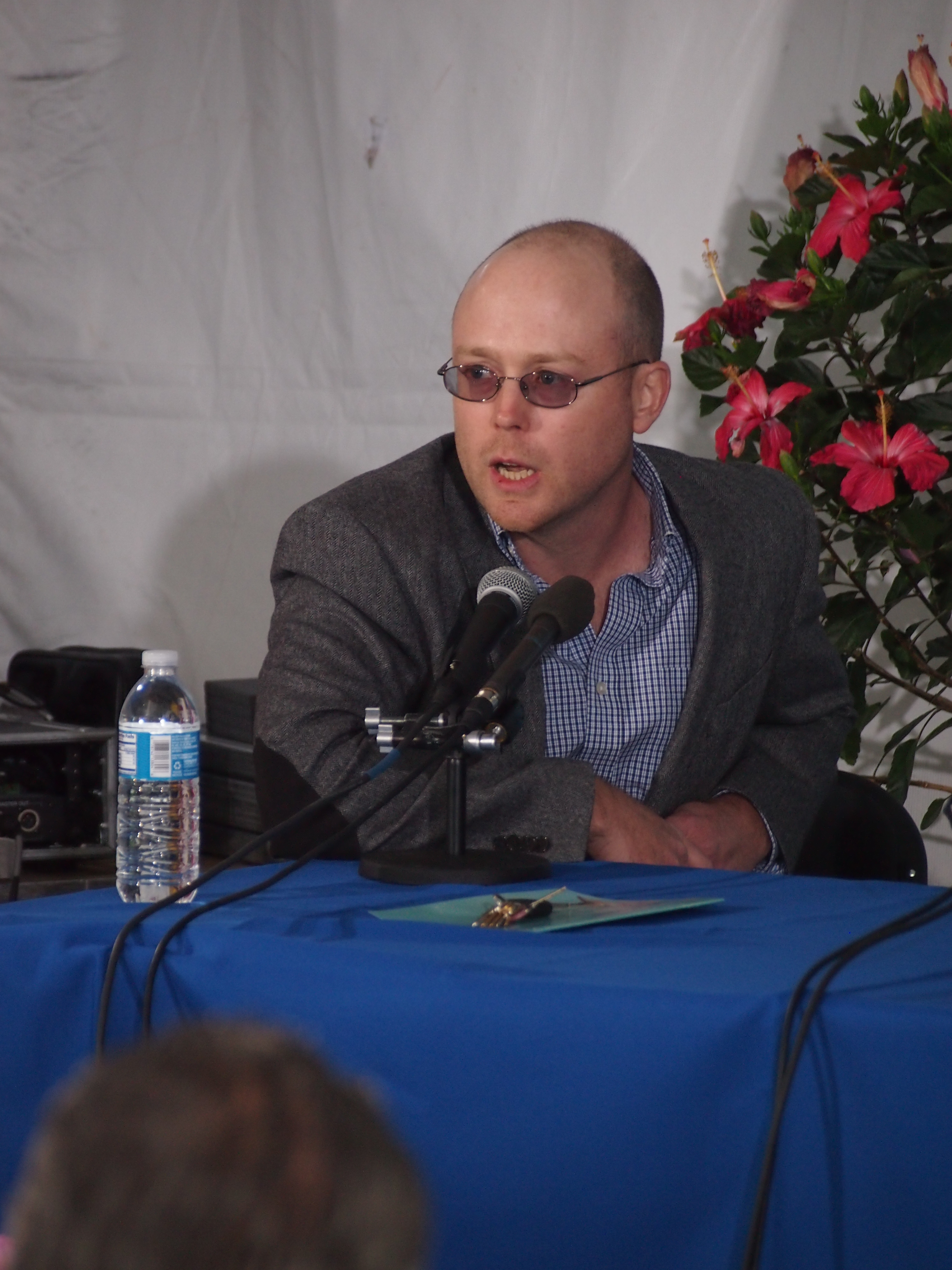
- Hylton at the 2014 Gaithersburg Book Festival
- Born: Baltimore, Maryland, U.S.
- Writing career
- Notable work: Vanished: The Sixty-Year Search for the Missing Men of World War II

Wil S. Hylton is an American journalist. He is a contributing writer for The New York Times Magazine and has published cover stories for The New Yorker, Rolling Stone, Esquire, Harper's, Details, GQ, New York, Outside, and many others.

== Early life and education ==
Hylton was born in Baltimore, Maryland and attended Baltimore City College high school. He enrolled in Kenyon College for a year before being expelled.

== Career ==
Hylton began publishing articles in The Baltimore Sun as a teenager, and was writing for major magazines by his early twenties. In 1999 he bicycled across Cuba for Esquire, climbed the Ecuadorean Andes for Details, and wrote about Hugh Hefner for Rolling Stone.

At 24, Hylton was hired as a Contributing Editor at Esquire, where he wrote about the invasion of Afghanistan, attempts to patent the human genome, and the prosecution of alleged nuclear spy Wen Ho Lee. After the 2003 invasion of Iraq, Hylton became a Washington Correspondent for GQ, publishing criticism of the war and drafting articles of impeachment for Dick Cheney. He was the first journalist to interview Joe Darby, the whistleblower at Abu Ghraib prison.

Hylton was hired by The New York Times Magazine as a Contributing Writer in 2010. In October 2011, Hugo Lindgren, editor of The New York Times Magazine, wrote, "By now you should know that when you see Wil's byline on a piece, it doesn't really matter what it's about. Just read it.” Hylton has written for the magazine about bioterrorism, the search for Air France Flight 447, the influence of Breitbart News, and the prosecution of police officers after the death of Freddie Gray. His February 8, 2015, article about the family detention policy to imprison Central American women and children was cited by a federal judge in an injunction to suspend the policy two weeks later. His 2016 profile of the painter Chuck Close was a finalist for the National Magazine Award in Feature Writing.

In 2018, Hylton stated on The Daily that he was conducting secret interviews with the Venezuelan opposition leader Leopoldo López, who at the time was under house arrest.

Hylton is a recipient of the John Bartlow Martin Award for Public Interest Journalism by the Medill School of Journalism and his articles have been anthologized in the books "Best Political Writing," "Best Music Writing," and "Best Business Stories." He is a Special Lecturer at Johns Hopkins University and a member of the faculty at the MFA program in creative nonfiction at Goucher College.

== Personal life ==
Hylton lives in Baltimore; he is divorced with two children.

== Bibliography ==
- "A bug in the system : why last night's chicken made you sick". Annals of Food. The New Yorker. 90 (46): 30–35. February 2, 2015.
- "My cousin was my hero. Until the day he tried to kill me". The New York Times Magazine. May 8, 2019.

The New York Times Magazine

- Down the Breitbart Hole
- Baltimore vs. Marilyn Mosby
- The Mysterious Metamorphosis of Chuck Close
- The Land of Smoke and Fog
- The God of Small Things
- What Happened to Air France Flight 447?
- How Ready Are We for Bioterrorism?

GQ

- Hope. Change. Reality.
- The Unspeakable Choice
- Meltdown

Harper's

- Broken Heartland
- Sick on the Inside

Esquire

- Mazar-i-Sharif
- Guilty

The Atlantic

- Deep-Sea Mining and the Race to the Bottom of the Ocean Reposted on MSN as "History's largest mining operation is about to begin"
