= Octavio Augusto Ceva Antunes =

Brazilian scientist

- Died: June 1, 2009; Atlantic Ocean
- Known for: Production of anti-HIV drugs
- Scientific career
- Institutions: Federal University of Rio de Janeiro

Octávio Augusto Ceva Antunes was a professor of chemistry and pharmaceutics at the Federal University of Rio de Janeiro who had published over 200 scientific articles during his veteran career at the university. Antunes had also served as consultant to the World Health Organization for the production of anti-HIV drugs for four years until 2008.

He was among 228 passengers aboard Air France Flight 447 from Rio de Janeiro, Brazil to Paris, France, which crashed into the Atlantic Ocean on 1 June 2009. His wife Patricia Nazareth Antunes and their 3-year-old son Matthew were also aboard.
