= Cricket (1914 automobile) =

Defunct American motor vehicle manufacturer

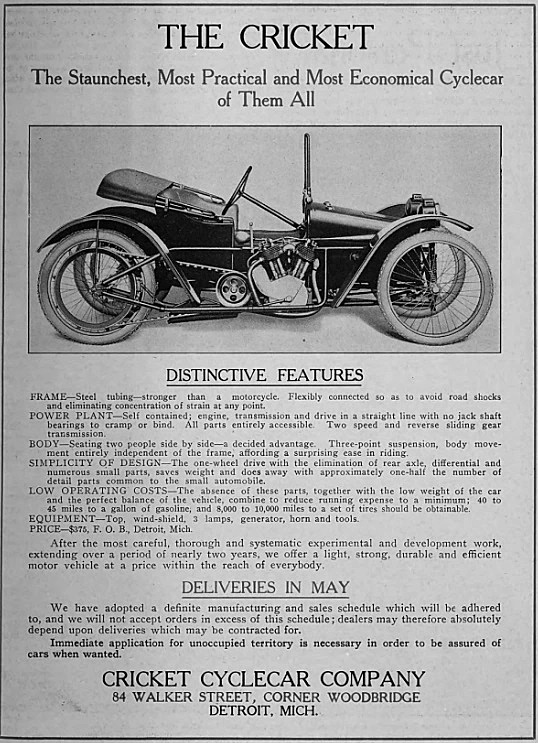
1914 Cricket advertisement

The Cricket was an American cyclecar manufactured in Detroit, Michigan, by the Cricket Cyclecar Company in 1913-1914. The Cricket featured an 84-inch wheelbase, weighed 500 pounds, and was powered by a 9hp V-twin engine located beside the driver. It sold for $325. A factory at 80 Walker Street and a showroom on Woodward Avenue were secured. In late 1914 the Cricket Cyclecar Company sold out to the Motor Products Company of Detroit, who had provided the V-twin engine for the Cricket.
