= Crickette Sanz =

Naturalist, explorer, and field biologist

Crickette Marie Sanz is a professor, naturalist, explorer, and field biologist notable for her work on primates and great apes in the Republic of the Congo.

== Background and career ==
Sanz received her BS and MS in experimental psychology from Central Washington University, followed by her PhD in anthropology from Washington University in St. Louis, where she is currently a professor of biological anthropology.

In 2003, Sanz and field researcher David B. Morgan encountered a naive population of chimpanzees in the Goualougo Triangle. They did not observe the documented aggression and warlike behaviors previously recorded by Jane Goodall, but instead a curious and friendly population they felt could be "...watch[ed] for 20 years to see what normal behavior really is for chimpanzees."

Sanz has appeared on television in documentaries about great apes.

Sanz's insights have included observations of novel tool use, documentation of the progress of simian foamy virus, and tracking populations using tools like genomics.

== Awards ==
- 2019 - Ai's Scarf / Women-in-Primatology Award

== Selected publications ==
- 2013: Tool Use in Animals: Cognition and Ecology. Cambridge University Press, ISBN 9781107011199
