= Izabela Maria Furtado Kestler =

Brazilian professor (1959-2009)

Izabela Maria Furtado Kestler (June 20, 1959 – June 1, 2009) was a Brazilian professor of German studies at the Federal University of Rio de Janeiro. Patrik von zur Mühlen described her as the foremost specialist on German language writers and editors exiled in Brazil during the Nazi-era. From 1998, she was editor-in-chief of forum deutsch, Revista Brasileira de Estudos Germânicos, a publication of the Association of Professors of German of Rio de Janeiro.

Kestler was killed on board Air France Flight 447 from Rio de Janeiro, Brazil to Paris, France, which crashed into the Atlantic Ocean on 1 June 2009. Her family donated her library of exile-related materials to the Casa Stefan Zweig in Brazil.

== Writings ==
- Die Exilliteratur und das Exil der deutschsprachigen Schriftsteller und Publizisten in Brasilien. Frankfurt am Main:Peter Lang, (1992) 267pp. ISBN 978-3-631-45160-1 (doctoral dissertation)
- section on Brazil in Handbuch der deutschsprachigen Emigration 1933-1945 (Handbook of German Language Emigration 1933-1945), eds. Krohn, von zur Mühlen, Paul and Winckler, in association with the Gesellschaft für Exilforschung. Darmstadt:Primus-Verlag, (1998) 678pp. ISBN 3-534-21999-6
- Exílio e literatura: escritores de fala alemã durante a época do nazismo. São Paulo:EdUSP, (2003) 291pp. ISBN 85-314-0732-X, (Portuguese translation of Die Exilliteratur, Karola Zimber, translator)
