= Louisiana State University School of Music =

Coordinates: 30.416587°N 91.178412°W

LSU School of Music
- Type: Public
- Established: 1931
- Director: Dr. James L. Byo
- Students: 410
- Location: Baton Rouge, Louisiana, United States, United States
- Website: www.lsu.edu/cmda/music

Louisiana State University School of Music (LSU, commonly referred to as LSU School of Music) is a music school located on the northwestern side of the campus of Louisiana State University in Baton Rouge, Louisiana, United States. The school is part of LSU's College of Music & Dramatic Arts, which also includes the LSU School of Theater. The college includes over 100 faculty and staff, over 600 majors, and offers wide range of degrees and curricular concentrations.

== Recent Accomplishments ==
- In 2002, the Louisiana State University Tiger Marching Band won the Sudler Trophy awarded by the John Philip Sousa Foundation, given to the top ranked college/university band in the nation. The Sudler Trophy is widely regarded as "the Heisman Trophy for bands."
- A 2004 PhD in Music (Composition) graduate won the MNTA-Shepherd Distinguished Composer of the Year Award.
- In 2005, an associate professor of musicology received a prestigious National Endowment for the Humanities.
- In 2006, Swine Palace Swine Palace, the University’s full-time professional, equity theater company received the YWCA Racial Justice Award, the first for an arts organization in the State of Louisiana. In the same year it received the 2006 Louisiana Governor's Arts Award for Large Arts Organizations.
- The LSU A Cappella Choir was the featured university choral group at the finale concert for the ACDA Annual Convention at the Walt Disney Center for the Performing Arts in Los Angeles.
- In 2007, Swine Palace was awarded its third NEA grant for the world premiere of Ping Chong’s drama, COCKTAIL. That same year, the company was also the recipient of an EST Sloan Grant and its second Shubert Foundation grant; in the past five years, Swine Palace has received more than $1.2 million in unearned income.
- In 2007, Swine Palace's production of The Heidi Chronicles, directed by department chair, Michael Tick, was invited to be produced at the Shanghai Dramatic Arts Centre and the Beijing Central Academy of Drama.
- In 2008, television and film composer/arranger Bill Conti, an alumnus, was inducted into the Louisiana Music Hall of Fame
- Under the guide of Robert Grayson, two opera students, Paul Groves and Lisette Oropesa, have won Metropolitan Opera National Council Auditions in 1991 and 2005 respectively, and have gone on to have international operatic careers and regularly sing at the Metropolitan Opera.
