= Sonnhild Kestler =

Swiss textile designer

Sonnhild Kestler (born 1963 in Germany, grew up in Zürich, Switzerland) is a Swiss textile designer. She was awarded the Schweizer Grand Prix Design in 2010 for her life's work. Her work was exhibited at the Museum of Design, Zurich in 2011. With the block printing method Kestler creates intricate textiles in limited series.

== Life and work ==
Between 1981 and 1985, Sonnhild Kestler studied textile design at the Schule für Gestaltung Zürich, the school for applied arts in Zurich. Since 1985, she has been working as an independent designer, for labels such as «Pink Flamingo», «Apropos» und «Sourire enSoie». Temporarily, she also worked as an illustrator and set designer for films. In 1988, together with Karin Wälchli, she opened her own studio, with a fabric printing shop. At the same time she opened the store Georg Couture with designer Matthias Georg in Zürich, where she sold her first pieces. To this day, she runs a one-woman textile manufacturing company.

Kestler manufactures her products at the block printing company and design label she founded in 1996: S.K. Hand-Druck, Zurich. Her products mainly consist of shawls, scarves, foulards, but also include terry linen, woven wool, and cotton scarves and accessories. Her works are inspired by folk art, the folklore of Eastern Europe, Asian art, traditional Indian textiles, and everyday culture. The designs are created in a collage technique: individual pictorial elements printed on paper, combined in variations over and over again before the images are manually screen-printed onto fabric. Her products are mostly made in Switzerland: for example, her scarves and foulards are spun in Appenzell. Only the embroideries are made in India and the crochet lace in Turkey. The textile designer creates small series that are sold exclusively at «Thema Selection».

== Awards ==
In 2010, Kestler was awarded the Grand Prix Design, which is endowed with 40'000 CHF. The Federal Office of Culture has been awarding this prize since 2007 to recognize Swiss designers or design studios that make a significant contribution to the reputation of Swiss design at national and international levels.
