= Cricket (warning sound) =

Cockpit audio alert used by airliners

A cricket is a type of cockpit audio alert onboard commercial aircraft such as those of Airbus. Its sound is intentionally designed to be extremely difficult for pilots to ignore. The "chirp chirp" sound is named after the insect that it imitates.
