= Deaths in June 2009 =

The following is a list of deaths in June 2009.

Entries for each day are listed alphabetically by surname. A typical entry lists information in the following sequence:

- Name, age, country of citizenship at birth, subsequent country of citizenship (if applicable), what subject was known for, cause of death (if known), and reference.

== June 2009 ==
=== 1 ===
- Thomas Berry, 94, American cultural historian and ecotheologian.
- Bob Christie, 85, American racing driver.
- Ken Clark, 81, American actor, heart attack.
- Ernest R. May, 80, American historian (Harvard University), complications from cancer surgery.
- Vincent O'Brien, 92, Irish race horse trainer.
- Aleksandr Potupa, 64, Belarusian politician, physicist, economist and writer.
- Jerry Rosenberg, 72, American jailhouse lawyer, natural causes.
- Parvin Soleimani, 86, Iranian actress, brain tumor.
- Dirk du Toit, 65, South African politician, suspected heart failure.
- Notable people that died in the crash of Air France Flight 447:
  - Octavio Augusto Ceva Antunes, Brazilian professor of chemistry and pharmaceutics.
  - Silvio Barbato, 50, Italian-born Brazilian conductor and composer.
  - Pablo Dreyfus, 39-40, Argentine arms control expert.
  - Izabela Maria Furtado Kestler, 49, Brazilian professor of German studies.
  - Giambattista Lenzi, 58, Italian politician.
  - Fatma Ceren Necipoğlu, 36, Turkish classical harpist and academic (Anadolu University in Eskişehir).
  - Prince Pedro Luiz of Orléans-Braganza, 26, Brazilian prince.

=== 2 ===
- William Booth, 70, Irish Anglican priest, Deputy Clerk of the Closet (1991–2007).
- Chung Kai-lai, 92, Chinese-born American mathematician.
- Jaye F. Dyer, 81-82, American energy executive.
- David Eddings, 77, American fantasy author.
- John Ernsting, 81, British Air Vice-Marshal, expert in aviation medicine.
- FrancEyE, 87, American poet, complications from a hip fracture.
- Terry Hankins, 34, American serial killer, execution by lethal injection.
- Alfred Kern, 85, American novelist and academic.
- Tony Maggs, 72, South African racing driver, cancer.
- Palghat R. Raghu, 81, Burmese-born Indian musician, cardiac arrest.
- Kidane-Mariam Teklehaimanot, 75, Ethiopian Roman Catholic prelate, Bishop of Adigrat (1985–2001).
- Paul O. Williams, 74, American science fiction author, aortic dissection.

=== 3 ===
- Geoffrey Bingham, 90, Australian evangelical Christian writer.
- David Bromige, 75, British-born Canadian poet and academic, winner of the Pushcart Prize, complications from diabetes.
- Sam Butera, 81, American saxophonist, Alzheimer's disease.
- James F. Calvert, 88, American naval officer, 46th Superintendent of the U.S. Naval Academy, heart failure.
- David Carradine, 72, American actor (Kung Fu, Kill Bill, Boxcar Bertha) and film director, erotic asphyxiation.
- Do Kum-bong, 79, South Korean actress.
- Sam George, 56, Canadian activist, native rights campaigner who advocated for the Ipperwash Inquiry following the Ipperwash Crisis, pancreatic and lung cancer.
- Thomas Gill, 87, American politician, U.S. Representative from Hawaii (1963–1965), after long illness.
- Frank Harrison, 69, American politician, U.S. Representative from Pennsylvania (1983–1985), natural causes.
- Geir Høgsnes, 58, Norwegian sociologist.
- Peter Landin, 78, British computer scientist, prostate cancer.
- Jack Ross, 110, Australian supercentenarian, last surviving Australian veteran of World War I.
- Shih Kien, 96, Hong Kong actor (Enter the Dragon).
- Koko Taylor, 80, American blues musician, complications from gastrointestinal surgery.

=== 4 ===
- Mojisola Adekunle-Obasanjo, 65, Nigerian army officer and politician.
- Lev Brovarskyi, 60, Ukrainian Soviet-era footballer and coach.
- Robert Colescott, 83, American painter, U.S. representative to Venice Biennale (1997).
- Ward Costello, 89, American actor and composer, complications from a stroke.
- Philip D. Curtin, 87, American historian, pneumonia.
- Luc Alfons de Hovre, 83, Belgian Roman Catholic prelate, Auxiliary Bishop Emeritus of Mechelen-Brussels (1982–2002).
- John F. Henning, 93, American politician and diplomat, United States Ambassador to New Zealand (1967–1969).
- Dorothy Layton, 96, American actress (County Hospital).
- Chris O'Brien, 57, Australian oncologist, surgeon on the reality television program RPA, brain tumour.
- Randy Smith, 60, American basketball player (Buffalo Braves), 1978 NBA All-Star Game MVP, heart attack.

=== 5 ===
- Rodolfo Almirón, 73, Argentine police officer and death squad leader (AAA).
- Bernard Barker, 92, Cuban-born American intelligence operative, Watergate burglar, lung cancer.
- Peter L. Bernstein, 90, American economic historian, pneumonia.
- Alan Berkman, 63, American physician and activist, lymphoma.
- Fleur Cowles, 101, American writer, editor and artist.
- Baciro Dabó, 51, Guinea-Bissauan politician, presidential candidate, shot.
- Jeff Hanson, 31, American singer–songwriter, mixed drug toxicity.
- Ola Hudson, 62, American fashion designer and costumier, cancer.
- Richard Jacobs, 83, American real estate developer, owner of the Cleveland Indians (1986–2001), after long illness.
- Luo Jing, 48, Chinese news presenter, lymphoma.
- Adilgerei Magomedtagirov, 53, Russian general, Interior Minister for the Republic of Dagestan, shot.
- Rajeev Motwani, 47, Indian-born American academic, advisor for Google, Inc.
- Boris Pokrovsky, 97, Russian opera director, People's Artist of the USSR.
- Helder Proença, Guinea-Bissauan politician, Minister of Defense, shot.
- Haydn Tanner, 92, British rugby union player.
- George Edward Wahlen, 84, American soldier, Medal of Honor recipient, after long illness.

=== 6 ===
- Charles Arnold-Baker, 90, British historian.
- Luke Cole, 46, American environmental lawyer, road accident.
- Jean Dausset, 92, French immunologist, Nobel Prize in Medicine (1980).
- Bobby Haarms, 75, Dutch football player and coach.
- Mary Howard de Liagre, 96, American actress (Abe Lincoln in Illinois, Swamp Water).
- Jim Owens, 82, American college football coach (Washington Huskies), complications from hypertension and heart problems.
- Pio Sagapolutele, 39, American Samoan footballer (Cleveland Browns, New England Patriots), aneurysm.

=== 7 ===
- Roy Boe, 79, American businessman, owner of New Jersey Nets (1969–1978), New York Islanders (1972–1979), heart failure.
- Leonard Guttridge, 90, English historian and author.
- Hugh Hopper, 64, British progressive rock bassist and composer (Soft Machine), leukaemia.
- Willie Kilmarnock, 87, Scottish footballer (Motherwell).
- Gordon Lennon, 26, Northern Irish footballer (Dumbarton), car crash.
- Kenny Rankin, 69, American singer-songwriter, lung cancer.
- Peter Townsend, 81, British sociologist, pneumonia.
- Baron Vaea, 88, Tongan politician, Prime Minister (1991–2000), after short illness.

=== 8 ===
- Om Prakash Aditya, 72, Indian poet, car accident.
- Omar Bongo, 73, Gabonese politician, President (1967–2009), heart attack.
- Frank Dasso, 91, American baseball player.
- Sheila Finestone, 82, Canadian politician, MP for Mount Royal (1984–1999) and Senator (1999–2002), cancer.
- Aage Rou Jensen, 84, Danish footballer.
- Harold Norse, 92, American poet.
- Johnny Palermo, 27, American actor (Just for Kicks, Everybody Hates Chris), car accident.
- Matt Simpson, 73, British poet and literary critic.
- Habib Tanvir, 85, Indian playwright and theatre director, after short illness.

=== 9 ===
- Duke Bainum, 56, American politician (Hawaii House of Representatives, Honolulu City Council), aortic aneurysm.
- Norman E. Brinker, 78, American restaurateur (Brinker International), aspiration pneumonia.
- Cyril Connell Jr., 81, Australian rugby league player.
- Edward Hanrahan, 88, American lawyer, State's Attorney (Cook County, Illinois), leukemia.
- Jean Hugel, 84, French winemaker (Alsace wine), cancer.
- Bill Lillard, 90, American baseball player (Philadelphia Athletics).
- Jack Littrell, 80, American baseball player, Alzheimer's disease.
- Dick May, 78, American racing driver, after long illness.
- John Francis Mitchell, 81, American electronics engineer, president of Motorola.
- Vera Mutafchieva, 80, Bulgarian historian.
- Michael Roof, 32, American actor (xXx, Black Hawk Down, The Dukes of Hazzard), suicide by hanging.
- Dave Simons, 54, American comic book artist, cancer.
- Arne Tovik, 53, Norwegian newspaper editor and journalist.
- Karl Michael Vogler, 80, German actor.

=== 10 ===
- Barry Beckett, 66, American record producer, session musician, keyboardist (Muscle Shoals Rhythm Section), natural causes.
- Rick Bébout, 59, American-born Canadian gay activist, journalist, and publisher of The Body Politic, complications from a stroke.
- Andrew Wendell Bogue, 90, American federal judge.
- John A. Eddy, 78, American astronomer, cancer.
- Tenniel Evans, 83, British actor.
- Xaver Frick, 96, Liechtensteinian Olympic athlete and cross-country skier.
- Aza Gazgireyeva, 54, Russian jurist, senior judge in Ingushetia, shot.
- Huey Long, 105, American singer (The Ink Spots).
- Nguyễn Khắc Ngư, 100, Vietnamese Roman Catholic prelate, bishop of Long Xuyên (1960–1997).
- Jack Nimitz, 79, American jazz baritone saxophonist, complications from emphysema.
- Marian Pour-El, 81, American mathematical logician.
- Richard Quick, 66, American swimming and diving coach, brain tumor.
- Stelios Skevofilakas, 70, Greek footballer (AEK Athens), stomach cancer.
- Helle Virkner, 83, Danish actress and first lady, cancer.

=== 11 ===
- Viacheslav Aliabiev, 75, Ukrainian footballer (Shakhtyor Stalino), USSR Cup winner (1961, 1962), cancer.
- Sidney W. Bijou, 100, American child psychologist.
- Marian Goliński, 59, Polish politician, car accident.
- Woodie Held, 77, American baseball player (Cleveland Indians), brain cancer.
- Jakob Kjersem, 83, Norwegian Olympic athlete.
- Frank J. Low, 75, American physicist and astronomer.
- Christel Peters, 93, German actress.
- Carl Pursell, 76, American politician, U.S. Representative from Michigan (1977–1993), heart disease.
- Ricardo Rangel, 85, Mozambican photojournalist.
- Sumire, 21, Japanese fashion model, brain hemorrhage.
- Roger Terry, 87, American airman (Tuskegee Airmen), heart failure.
- Peter Wheeler, 65, British chemical engineer and businessman, owner of TVR, after short illness.
- Heinrich Zoller, 86, Swiss botanist, after a short illness

=== 12 ===
- Shailaja Acharya, 65, Nepalese politician, Deputy Prime Minister (1998), Alzheimer's disease and pneumonia.
- Annesley Dias, 82, Sri Lankan comedian,
- György Ekrem-Kemál, 63, Hungarian far-right political activist, lung cancer.
- Robinson Everett, 81, American judge, member of the Court of Appeals for the Armed Forces since 1980.
- Charles Fenton, 97, Australian politician, member (1957–1981) and President (1972–1981) of the Tasmanian Legislative Council.
- Peter Gowan, 63, British professor of politics, mesothelioma.
- Andy Hughes, 43, British musician (The Orb), producer and DJ.
- Ivan Lichter, 91, New Zealand physician, pioneer in palliative care.
- Félix Malloum, 76, Chadian politician, President (1975–1979), cardiac arrest.
- Rosa Markmann, 101, Chilean First Lady (1946–1952).

=== 13 ===
- Bashir Aushev, 62, Russian public official, Deputy Prime Minister of Ingushetia (2002–2008), shot.
- Otilio Galíndez, 73, Venezuelan poet and composer.
- Mitsuharu Misawa, 46, Japanese professional wrestler (AJPW), spinal cord injury.
- John Saville, 93, British Marxist economic and social historian.

=== 14 ===
- Khalil Abi-Nader, 87, Lebanese Maronite prelate, archbishop of Beirut (1986–1996).
- Bob Bogle, 69, American guitarist (The Ventures), non-Hodgkin lymphoma.
- Angela Coughlan, 56, Canadian swimmer, bronze medalist (1968 Summer Olympics), multiple myeloma.
- Ivan Della Mea, 68, Italian singer–songwriter and author, after long illness.
- Yasuharu Hasebe, 77, Japanese film director, pneumonia.
- Dorothy Kozak, 77, Canadian Olympic sprinter.
- Li Wenqing, 79, Chinese politician.
- William McIntyre, 91, Canadian jurist, Puisne Justice of the Supreme Court of Canada (1979–1989), throat cancer.
- Moumouni Adamou Djermakoye, 70, Nigerien politician.
- Carlos Pardo, 33, Mexican NASCAR race driver, race crash.
- Jackie Ronne, 89, American explorer, first American woman to visit Antarctica, cancer.
- Frederick Sontag, 84, American academic and author, professor of philosophy (Pomona College), heart failure.
- Abel Tador, 24, Nigerian footballer, shot.
- Hal Woodeshick, 76, American baseball player (Houston Colt .45s), after long illness.

=== 15 ===
- Sohrab Aarabi, 19, Iranian student, shot.
- George Belotti, 74, American football player, complications of a stroke.
- Antonio Bianco, 57, South African diamond cutter, cancer.
- Helen Boosalis, 89, American politician, Mayor of Lincoln, Nebraska (1975–1983), brain tumor.
- Charles Horan, 85, British police officer.
- Joginder, 59, Indian actor.
- Allan King, 79, Canadian film director (Warrendale, Termini Station, Silence of the North), brain tumor.
- Henryk Lewczuk, 85, Polish soldier.
- Desmond Moran, 60, Australian criminal, member of Moran family, shot.

=== 16 ===
- John Anthony, 76, British Olympic shooter.
- Peter Arundell, 75, British racing driver, pulmonary fibrosis.
- Emmanuel Constant, 81, Haitian Roman Catholic prelate, Bishop of Les Gonaïves (1966–2003).
- Paul A. Fino, 95, American politician, U.S. Representative from New York (1953–1968).
- Celia Fremlin, 95, British crime novelist.
- D. Mark Hegsted, 95, American nutritionist, research led to recommended decrease in dietary saturated fats.
- Eleanor Himmelfarb, 98, American artist, teacher and conservationist.
- Charlie Mariano, 85, American jazz alto saxophonist, cancer.
- Tina Marsh, 55, American jazz vocalist, breast cancer.
- Frank Herbert Mason, 88, American artist and teacher.
- Proud Accolade, 7, American Thoroughbred racehorse, neurological disorder.
- Sheila Rodwell, 62, British epidemiologist.

=== 17 ===
- Joji Banuve, 68-69, Fijian politician, Minister for Local Government and the Environment, after short illness.
- José Calvário, 58, Portuguese maestro and orchestrator, complications from heart attack.
- Ralf Dahrendorf, Baron Dahrendorf, 80, German-born British sociologist and politician, cancer.
- Alejandro Doria, 72, Argentine film director, pneumonia.
- Patrick Dowling, 89, British television producer.
- Eon, 55, British musician, complications from pneumonia.
- José Ignacio García Hamilton, 65, Argentine politician and historian.
- Jane Aiken Hodge, 91, American-born British writer, suicide by drug overdose.
- Wayne L. Horvitz, 88, American labor mediator, cancer.
- John Houghtaling, 92, American businessman and inventor (Magic Fingers vibrating bed), complications from a fall.
- IZ the Wiz, 50, American graffiti artist, heart attack.
- Darrell Powers, 86, American soldier (Easy Company).
- Dusty Rhodes, 82, American baseball player (New York Giants), complications from diabetes and emphysema.
- Ali Said, Somali public servant, chief of police (Mogadishu), shot.
- Perry Salles, 70, Brazilian actor (Mandala, Cinderela Baiana, O Clone) and film director, lung cancer.
- Shacky Tauro, 49, Zimbabwean footballer, after short illness.
- Tony Wong, 60, Canadian politician.
- Gordon Wray, 57, British-born Canadian politician.

=== 18 ===
- Omar Hashi Aden, Somali politician, Minister of Security, suicide bomb attack.
- Giovanni Arrighi, 71, Italian economist.
- Hortensia Bussi, 94, Chilean First Lady (1970–1973), widow of President Salvador Allende, natural causes.
- Victor Cosson, 93, French road bicycle racer.
- Terry Griffiths, 64, Australian politician.
- Sir Henry Hodge, 65, British jurist, High Court judge since 2004, acute myeloid leukaemia.
- Heyward Isham, 82, American diplomat.
- Ali Akbar Khan, 87, Indian sarod player, kidney failure.

=== 19 ===
- Alberto Andrade, 65, Peruvian politician, pulmonary fibrosis.
- Sir Derrick Bailey, 90, British cricketer and baronet, son of diamond tycoon and politician Sir Abe Bailey.
- H. A. Boucher, 88, American politician, first elected Lieutenant Governor of Alaska (1970–1974).
- Ron Crocombe, 79, New Zealand academic (University of the South Pacific), heart attack.
- Vicenç Ferrer Moncho, 89, Spanish Jesuit missionary and philanthropist.
- Shelly Gross, 88, American Broadway producer, bladder cancer.
- Jörg Hube, 65, German actor, cancer.
- Arthur W. Lehman, 91, American euphonium player, pulmonary fibrosis.
- Peter Newbrook, 88, British cinematographer and film producer.
- Gary Papa, 54, American television sportscaster (WPVI-TV), prostate cancer.
- Ken Roberts, 99, American actor and announcer, pneumonia.
- Herschel Rosenthal, 91, American politician, member of the California Senate (1982–1998).
- Bob Schuler, 66, American politician, member of the Ohio Senate since 2002, cancer.
- Stan Sismey, 92, Australian cricketer.

=== 20 ===
- Colin Bean, 83, British actor (Dad's Army).
- Aldo Gargani, 76, Italian philosopher.
- Joel Helleny, 52, American trombonist,
- Ralph F. Hirschmann, 87, American biochemist (synthesis of the first enzyme), renal failure.
- Nazir Jairazbhoy, 81, British-born American ethnomusicologist.
- Naci Kınacıoğlu, 79-80, Turkish academician, legal scholar, interim Minister of Transport.
- Patrick Kombayi, 70, Zimbabwean politician and businessman, complications from 1990 shooting.
- Godfrey Rampling, 100, British athlete, 1936 Olympic relay champion, NATO commander, father of actress Charlotte Rampling.
- Kenneth L. Reusser, 89, American Marine aviator, decorated veteran of World War II, Korean and Vietnam Wars.
- Neda Agha-Soltan, 26, Iranian student.
- Anthony Yeo, 60, Singaporean counsellor, Burkitt's lymphoma.

=== 21 ===
- Gilda Galán, 92, Puerto Rican actress.
- Lorena Gale, 51, Canadian actress (Battlestar Galactica, The Perfect Score, The Butterfly Effect) and playwright, throat cancer.
- José Nicomedes Grossi, 93, Brazilian Roman Catholic prelate, Bishop of Bom Jesus da Lapa (1962–1990).
- Errol Harris, 101, South African philosopher.
- Arthur Luft, 94, Manx politician and deemster.

=== 22 ===
- Agnes Tachyon, 11, Japanese Thoroughbred racehorse, heart failure.
- Betty Allen, 82, American operatic mezzo-soprano, kidney disease.
- Bert Bank, 94, American radio pioneer and politician, Bataan Death March survivor.
- David Farquhar, 82, Australian politician, member of the Tasmanian House of Assembly (1972–1976).
- Alec Gallup, 81, American pollster, chairman of the Gallup Poll, heart disease.
- June Gordon, Marchioness of Aberdeen and Temair, 95, British musician and patron of the arts.
- Maj-Len Grönholm, 57, Finnish politician and beauty queen, councilwoman, Miss Finland (1972), cancer.
- Akhtar Imam, 91, Bangladeshi educationist.
- Moisei Itkis, 80, Soviet Olympic shooter.
- Hanne Kjærholm, 79, Danish architect.
- Billy Red Lyons, 77, Canadian professional wrestler, cancer.
- Eddie Preston, 84, American jazz trumpeter.
- Steve Race, 88, British broadcaster and musician.
- Philip Simmons, 97, American blacksmith.
- Karel Van Miert, 67, Belgian politician, European Commissioner (1989–1999), cardiac arrest resulting in fall.
- Sam B. Williams, 88, American engineer and inventor.

=== 23 ===
- Thurman Adams Jr., 80, American politician, member of the Delaware Senate since 1972, pancreatic cancer.
- Raymond Berthiaume, 78, Canadian jazz musician, singer and record producer, cancer.
- Phyllis Busansky, 72, American politician, county commissioner and supervisor of elections (Hillsborough County, Florida).
- John Callaway, 72, American journalist (Chicago Tonight), heart attack.
- Harold H. Carstens, 84, American magazine publisher.
- Gegham Ghandilyan, 35, Armenian actor, car accident.
- İsmet Güney, 85, Cypriot artist and cartoonist, designed flag of the Republic of Cyprus, cancer.
- Hanne Hiob, 86, German actress, daughter of poet and playwright Bertolt Brecht.
- Akpan Isemin, 69-70, Nigerian politician.
- Johny Joseph, 45, Haitian news presenter (Télévision Nationale d'Haiti), cancer.
- Thomas M. King, 80, American Roman Catholic priest and theologian, expert on Pierre Teilhard de Chardin, heart attack.
- Ed McMahon, 86, American television host (Star Search) and announcer (The Tonight Show).
- Aram Miskaryan, 36, Armenian actor, car accident.
- Jerri Nielsen, 57, American physician, treated herself for breast cancer on Antarctica in 1999, breast cancer.
- Pierpaolo Pedroni, 45, Italian rugby union player, referee and commentator
- Robin Plackett, 88, British statistician.
- Jackie Swindells, 72, British footballer.

=== 24 ===
- Irv Homer, 85, American talk show host, heart attack.
- Olja Ivanjicki, 78, Serbian painter.
- Tim Krekel, 58, American guitarist and songwriter, cancer.
- Robèrt Lafont, 87, French academic.
- Roméo LeBlanc, 81, Canadian politician (1973–1994), Governor General (1995–1999), Alzheimer's disease.
- Robert B. Pamplin, 97, American executive, President of Georgia-Pacific (1957–1976).
- Edward Arthur Thomas, 58, American football coach, NFL High School Football Coach of the Year (2005), shot.
- Steven Wells, 49, British journalist and author, cancer.

=== 25 ===
- Ramon Alcaraz, 93, Filipino World War II veteran and recipient of the Silver Star.
- Don Coldsmith, 83, American western author, stroke.
- Neera Desai, 84, Indian academician, political activist and Women's Studies pioneer.
- George Ernest, 87, American film actor.
- Farrah Fawcett, 62, American actress (Charlie's Angels, The Cannonball Run, Dr. T & the Women), anal cancer.
- Morton Gottlieb, 88, American Broadway theatre producer, Tony Award winner (1971), natural causes.
- James Baker Hall, 74, American poet and academic, Kentucky Poet Laureate (2001–2003), natural causes.
- Tōshirō Ishida, 96, Japanese military employee, pneumonia.
- Michael Jackson, 50, American Hall of Fame singer, ("Thriller", "Billie Jean", "Smooth Criminal") and dancer, nine-time Grammy winner, acute propofol intoxication.
- Clifton Johnson, 67, American jurist, North Carolina Superior Court (1978–1982) and Court of Appeals (1982–1996).
- Jack Johnson, 78, Canadian politician.
- Brian Jones, 70, British poet.
- Sylvia Levin, 91, American civic and voter registration activist, registered 47,000 new voters, stroke.
- Shiv Charan Mathur, 83, Indian politician, Governor of Assam since 2008, Chief Minister of Rajasthan (1988–1989), cardiac arrest.
- Mian Tufail Mohammad, 95, Pakistani politician, cerebral hemorrhage.
- Bela Mukherjee, 89, Indian singer, widow of singer and composer Hemanta Mukherjee, natural causes.
- Paul V. Nolan, 85, American physician and statesman, liver cancer.
- Kaleem Omar, 72, Pakistani poet and journalist, heart failure.
- Sky Saxon, 71, American rock musician (The Seeds), heart failure.
- Hugh Scaife, 79, British set decorator (The Elephant Man, The Spy Who Loved Me, A Passage to India).
- Zinaida Stahurskaya, 38, Belarusian cyclist, training collision (car accident).
- Anil Wilson, 62, Indian educator, Principal of St. Stephen's College, Delhi (1991–2007), pancreatic cancer.
- Yasmine, 37, Belgian singer and television presenter, suicide by hanging.

=== 26 ===
- Jo Amar, 79, Moroccan-born Israeli singer.
- Margot Ebert, 83, German actress (Sie kannten sich alle, Goods for Catalonia).
- Bernard Ganley, 82, British rugby league player.
- Amnon Kapeliouk, 78, Israeli journalist and author.
- Erhard Karkoschka, 86, German composer.
- Mihai Naca, 70, Romanian rugby union coach
- Tom Wilkes, 69, American art director.

=== 27 ===
- Ernst Barkmann, 89, German World War II Waffen-SS soldier and Panzer ace.
- Frank Barlow, 98, British historian.
- Victoriano Crémer, 102, Spanish poet and journalist, natural causes.
- Mary Lou Forbes, 83, American journalist, Pulitzer Prize winner (1959), breast cancer.
- Kishore Sarja, 50, Indian film director.
- Willy Kyrklund, 88, Finnish-born Swedish author.
- Fayette Pinkney, 61, American musician (The Three Degrees), respiratory failure.
- Nanae Sasaki, 53, Japanese marathon runner, colorectal cancer.
- Gale Storm, 87, American actress (My Little Margie, The Gale Storm Show).
- Gordon Taylor, 93, British Anglican priest and Royal Navy chaplain.
- Jackie Washington, 89, Canadian blues musician, complications from a heart attack.

=== 28 ===
- Terry Black, 62, Canadian singer, multiple sclerosis.
- Joseph Crowdy, 85, British soldier, Commandant of the Royal Army Medical Corps.
- Josep Maria Guix Ferreres, 81, Spanish Roman Catholic prelate, archbishop of Vic (1983–2003).
- Rita Keane, 86, Irish traditional singer.
- A. K. Lohithadas, 54, Indian screenwriter and film director, heart attack.
- Billy Mays, 50, American pitchman (OxiClean) and television host (Pitchmen), hypertensive heart disease.
- Jeff Swanagan, 51, American founding executive director and president of the Georgia Aquarium, heart attack.
- Fred Travalena, 66, American comedian and impressionist, non-Hodgkin lymphoma.
- Tom Wilkes, 69, American graphic designer.
- Maynard L. Young Jr., 84, American politician.
- Yu Hyun-mok, 83, South Korean film director, cerebral infarction.

=== 29 ===
- Dave Batters, 39, Canadian politician, MP for Palliser (2004–2008), suicide.
- Joe Bowman, 84, American bootmaker and sharpshooter, heart attack.
- Mohammad Hoqouqi, 72, Iranian poet, cirrhosis.
- Pauline Picard, 62, Canadian politician, MP for Drummond (1993–2008), lung cancer.
- Jan Rubeš, 89, Czech-born Canadian actor (Witness, Snow Falling on Cedars, D2: The Mighty Ducks) and opera singer, stroke.
- Sandra Warfield, 88, American operatic mezzo-soprano, complications from a stroke.

=== 30 ===
- Pina Bausch, 68, German modern dance choreographer, cancer.
- Paquito Cordero, 76, Puerto Rican actor, comedian and producer, respiratory disease.
- Robert DePugh, 86, American anti-Communist activist.
- Liam Fairhurst, 14, British fundraiser, synovial sarcoma.
- Jay Kleven, 59, American baseball player.
- James F. McNulty, Jr., 83, American politician, U.S. Representative from Arizona (1983–1985), Parkinson's disease.
- Jan Molander, 89, Swedish actor and film director.
- Luis Oliva, 101, Argentine Olympic athlete.
- Harve Presnell, 75, American actor (Fargo, Saving Private Ryan, Patch Adams) and singer, pancreatic cancer.
- Shi Pei Pu, 70, Chinese opera singer, gender-bending spy who was basis for M. Butterfly.
