= Ecological Society of Germany, Austria and Switzerland =

Learned society for the promotion of scientific ecology

- Gesellschaft für Ökologie
- Abbreviation: GfÖ
- Formation: 1970
- Founder: Lore Steubing
- Founded at: Giessen
- Type: Eingetragener Verein
- Headquarters: Berlin
- Location: Germany
- Region served: Europe
- Fields: Ecology
- Members: 1300
- Official language: German, English
- President: Christian Ammer
- Publication: Basic and Applied Ecology
- Award: GfÖ Medal of Honour
- Website: www.gfoe.org

The Ecological Society of Germany, Austria and Switzerland is a learned society for the promotion of scientific ecology in German-speaking countries. The society is the world's third largest scientific society in the field of ecology after the Ecological Society of America and the British Ecological Society.

== Goals ==
- Promotion of basic and applied ecological research
- Supporting co-operation between all ecological disciplines
- Improving the scientific exchange of ecologists in German-speaking countries and beyond
- Supporting ecological education at universities and other institutions of higher education
- Promoting the application and implementation of ecological knowledge and methods in practice
- Representation of ecological interests in public

To this end, the society organises an annual conference with workshops, awards prizes, publishes the international journal Basic and Applied Ecology and writes statements such as on new genetic engineering (2023), biodiversity loss (2022) and the United Nations Sustainable Development Goals (2015).

== Conferences and network ==
The annual meeting is one of the most important ecological conferences in the German-speaking region. Since 1972, the society organizes these meetings over five days at different Universities in Germany, Austria or Switzerland. One day is used for ecological excursions into the surrounding area. The meetings are organised under a conference theme that reflects current discourses in scientific-ecological research. The focus is on terrestrial ecology including limnology. The largest conference was held in Leipzig with over 1000 participants in 2023.

The society is member of the German National Committee of Biology (DNK), of the German Life Sciences Association (VBiO), of the umbrella organisation of agricultural research (DAF), of the European Ecological Federation (EEF) and the International Association for Ecology (INTECOL).

== Publications ==
The society publishes the international journal Basic and Applied Ecology (Elsevier) since 2000. For members, information are distributed by the German-language magazine Nachrichten der GfÖ twice a year. The publicationVerhandlungen der Gesellschaft für Ökologie (ISSN 0171-1113) published from 1972 to 2000 articles of summaries of oral presentations or posters at the annual conference. A long-standing publisher was Jörg Pfadenhauer (1987–2000).

== Specialist groups ==
Many activities of the society are organized by the specialist groups. These working groups mirror the wide spectrum of ecological topics of the GfÖ. Specialist groups like Population Biology or Macroecology organize own small conferences.

- Agroecology (since 2021)
- Soil ecology (since 2002)
- Computational ecology
- Macroecology
- Conservation and restoration ecology (since 2015)
- Ecosystem science (since 1998)
- Plant population biology (since 1988)
- Urabn ecology
- Dryland research
- Environmental education
- Forest ecology (since 2012)
- Young Modellers in Ecology (seit 2005)

== History ==
The society was founded by 18 ecologists in Giessen in 1970 as the Working Group Ecology. Amont these ecologists were Heinz Ellenberg, Wolfgang Haber, Lore Steubing, Heinrich Walter and Otti Wilmanns. In 1972, the first president Lore Steubing invited to the first conference in Giessen. In 1973 were the working group registered as Gesellschaft für Ökologie in the register of associations. At the beginning of the 2000s, the society became internationally orientated and the English-language journal Basic and Applied Ecology was launched and the conferences were held in English.

Founding members
Name	Universität/Institut
Reinhard Bornkamm (†)	Berlin
Heinz Ellenberg (†)	Goettingen
Herr Ernst	
Gisbert Große-Brauckmann (†)	Darmstadt
Wolfgang Haber	Munich-Freising
Hans-Dieter Knapp	Halle
Karl-Heinz Kreeb	
Herr Kunze	
Walter Larcher	Innsbruck
Wilhelm Lötschert (†)	Frankfurt
Herr Meyer	
Hans Jürgen Overbeck (†)	Max-Planck Institute for Limnology, Plön, Schleswig-Holstein
Karl-Friedrich Schreiber (†)	Münster
Lore Steubing (†)	Giessen
Heinrich Walter (†)	Stuttgart-Hohenheim
Otti Wilmanns (†)	Fribourg
Herr Winkler	
Georg Vieweg	

Presidents of the society before Christian Ammer (since 2019) were Lore Steubing (1970–1972), Paul Müller (1972–1976), Karl-Friedrich Schreiber (1976–1979), Wolfgang Haber (1979–1990), Wilhelm Kuttler (1993–1996), Robert Guderian (1997–1999), Jörg Pfadenhauer (2000–2005) and Volkmar Wolters (2005–2019).

== GfÖ Medal of Honour ==
This award goes to persons with a significant contribution to the scientific ecology.

Jahr	Name	Ort der Universität
2025	Volker Grimm	Leipzig, Germany
2024	Christian Körner	Basel, Switzerland
2023	Sandra Lavorel	Grenoble, France
2022	Nina Buchmann	Zurich, Switzerland
2021	Teja Tscharntke	Goettingen, Germany
2020	Bernhard Schmid	Zurich, Switzerland
