= EEF =

EEF or Eef may refer to:

== People ==
- Eef, nickname of Ifar Eef Barzelay (fl. 1991–present), Israeli-American musician
- Eef, nickname of Evert Dolman (1946–1993), Danish cyclist
- Eef Kamerbeek (1934–2008), Dutch decathlete
- Eef, pen name of Ethan Nicolle (fl. 1995–present), American comic illustrator and writer

== EEF ==
- EEF (manufacturers' association), a British manufacturers' organisation
- Early European Farmers, early Neolithic farmers who brought agriculture to Europe
- Eastern Economic Forum, an international forum held each year in Vladivostok, Russia
- Education Endowment Foundation, a British educational charity
- Egypt Exploration Fund, a British archaeological organization
- Egyptian Expeditionary Force, a British Empire force in World War I
- Enterprise environmental factor, a factor that originates from outside of the project or organization
- Eukaryotic elongation factors
- European Ecological Federation

== See also ==
- Eefing, a vocal technique
