= Carlos M. Herrera =

Spanish biologist

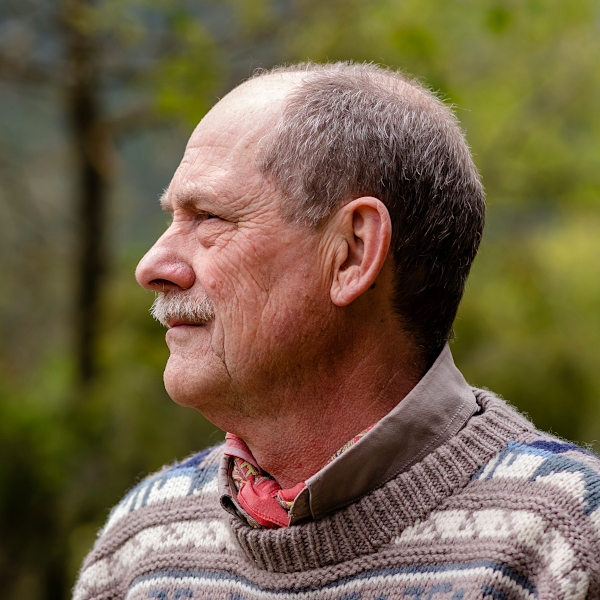
- Carlos M. Herrera, 2020
- Born: 17 October 1952 (age 74); Seville, Spain
- Education: University of Seville
- Awards: President's Gold Medal, British Ecological Society (1991); President's Award, American Society of Naturalists (1992); Ernst Haeckel Prize, European Ecological Federation (2017)
- Scientific career
- Fields: Evolutionary ecology
- Workplaces: Estación Biológica de Doñana (Spanish Council for Scientific Research, CSIC)
- Website: https://www.plant-animal.es/

Carlos Manuel Herrera (Seville, 17 October 1952) is a Spanish biologist who works in the field of evolutionary ecology, in particular plant–animal interactions.

== Biography ==
Herrera received his B.Sc. (1974) and Ph.D. (1977) degrees in Biology both from the University of Seville, Spain. Tenured researcher at the Spanish National Research Council (CSIC) since 1979 and then Research Professor of the same institution since 1986. He carried out his doctoral studies associated to the then-incipient Estación Biológica de Doñana, a research institute of CSIC founded in Seville in 1965 by ornithologist, ecologist and conservationist José Antonio Valverde, who was his mentor and thesis advisor. Herrera's scientific career has been always associated with this institute, in which he served as Deputy Director and Chair of the Department of Evolutionary Ecology in the 1980s–90s. He is a naturalist, scientific communicator and conservationist and has published on his research for popular audiences in Quercus Magazine. He is involved in the preservation of the Sierras de Cazorla, Segura and Las Villas Natural Park (Jaén Province, southeastern Spain), he was a member of its Governing Board since its constitution in 1986 until 2022, and since 1978 has spent most of his time conducting field research there.

== Research ==
Herrera's research has innovated in a variety of ecological topics and subdisciplines, mostly related to plant–animal and plant–animal–microbe interactions, the genetic and epigenetic structure of wild plant populations, plant reproductive biology, and the evolutionary significance of subindividual variation in higher plants. His research has always adopted an unprejudiced, detailed observation of nature as the starting point to confront "the problem of evolutionary constraints in how natural selection acts on evolving interspecific interactions, and he has explored how variation in the outcome of interspecific interactions affects the ecological and evolutionary dynamics of interacting plants and animals". Herrera has been considered "among the first to move evolutionary ecology from undiluted adaptationism to a view that includes phylogenetic inertia and trade-offs, as well as rapid evolution”, being also a pioneer at performing rigorous quantitative long-term studies of multifaceted ecological interactions. He was also one of the first to appreciate the importance of phylogenetic inertia and historical contingency to understand coevolution between plants and animals, and "looked at comparative data differently and asked whether associations among characters might reflect, at least in part, the influence of historical evolution", demonstrating that some of these historical factors are more important than extant ecological processes in driving observed ecological patterns, a finding that radically changed the view of current patterns in the Mediterranean flora and vegetation. His 2002 book Plant-Animal Interactions. An Evolutionary Approach, co-edited with Olle Pellmyr, has become a widely used textbook on plant–animal interactions "due to its thorough coverage, balanced approach emphasizing multispecies interactions, and well-conceived future directions".

As regards pollination ecology, he studied the mechanisms and implications of three-way interactions linking animal pollinators, plants and nectar microbes using novel experimental approaches, including insect and flower thermal ecology. More recently, his long-term pollinator studies conducted over 25 years in Sierras de Cazorla, Segura and Las Villas Natural Park have shed new light on the determinants of pollinator decline by showing that the nature of the phenomenon is site- and taxon-specific.

His 2009 book Multiplicity in Unity – Plant Subindividual Variation and Interactions with Animals, which focuses on intraplant variation and its effects on animal mutualists and antagonists, represented an innovative approach to the study of plant phenotypic variation, and has been considered "a landmark book" that "provides a new way of looking at an old question". Following the publication of this book, Herrera led a long series of observational and experimental investigations over 2010-2022 which dealt with plant and yeast epigenetics in relation to their ecology. These studies proved the ecological significance of the epigenetic layer of potentially heritable variations as a source of both within and among-genotype functional variation in wild populations of non-model plants and yeasts, and have elicited significant positive reactions from peers.

== Awards and distinctions ==
- 1987. Corresponding Fellow, American Ornithologists' Union, USA.
- 1991. President's Gold Medal, British Ecological Society, UK.
- 1992. President's Award, American Society of Naturalists, USA.
- 1994. Corresponding Member, Botanical Society of America, USA
- 1994. Elected Member, Academia Europaea.
- 2001. Spanish National Research Award ('Alejandro Malaspina' National Research Award). Ministry of Science and Technology, Spain.
- 2002. Honorary Membership Award. Ecological Society of America, USA.
- 2003. Thomson Reuters Highly-Cited Researcher in Ecology/Environmental Science.
- 2003. Honorary Fellowship Award. Spanish Society for Terrestrial Ecology, AEET.
- 2004. Andalucía Environment Award. Board of Andalusia.
- 2006. Elected Member. Royal Academy of Sciences of Seville, Spain
- 2011. Honorary Fellowship Award. Spanish Society of Evolutionary Biology (SESBE)
- 2017. Ernst Haeckel Prize, European Ecological Federation,
