= Gordon Taylor =

Gordon Taylor may refer to:

- Gordon Taylor (politician) (1910–2003), Canadian politician, businessman and teacher
- Gordon Taylor (Royal Navy chaplain) (1915–2009), Royal Navy chaplain, Anglican priest, author and clergyman
- Gordon Taylor (footballer) (born 1944), English former footballer
- Gordon Rattray Taylor (1911–1981), British author and journalist
- Gordon Taylor (aviator) (1896–1966), Australian aviator and author
