= Mathematical Sciences Foundation =

Indian institution for education and research

- Type: Research Institution, Educational Institution
- Established: July, 2002
- Director: Professor Dinesh Singh
- Address: Room XF, St. Stephen's College, Delhi 110007, India, Delhi, India
- Website: http://www.mathscifound.org

Mathematical Sciences Foundation (MSF) was formally registered as a non-profit society in 2002 by Dr. Anil Wilson. It is an institute of education and research, located in Delhi, India. Its goal is the promotion of mathematics and its applications at all levels, from school to college to research.

== Educational programmes ==
=== Undergraduate ===
- Mathematical Finance: A hands-on introduction to modern Finance and the role of mathematics in it.
- Mathematical Simulation with IT: Explores the interaction between Mathematics, Technology, and Education.

=== Graduate ===
In association with the University of Houston, leading to PhD's in Mathematics, Computer Science, and Physics. Students are trained at MSF for a year before heading to Houston.

== Seminars and conferences ==
- A Life of Mathematics: An annual programme under which eminent mathematicians reside at St. Stephen's College to interact with students and faculty. Recent visitors under this programme have been Sir Michael Atiyah, M S Narasimhan and Martin Golubitsky (President, SIAM).
- Mathematics in the 20th Century: An international conference held in Delhi in 2006 to commemorate the birth centenary of André Weil.

== Contests ==
- MSF Challenge: An annual contest, first held in 2006, to encourage school students to use computers for mathematical problem solving.
- Recognizing Ramanujan: An annual contest, first held in 2019, to encourage school students in adapting to unique thinking ability in mathematical problem solving. This contest also encourages students to get to know about the great Indian Mathematician Srinivasa Ramanujan.

Akshit Gupta from Delhi Public School Rohini topped the first edition of this contest with 75% marks which was almost 15% more than the next best student in the edition. He till date remains the only student to secure a perfect score in the mathematical problem solving section of the exam.

Navvye Anand from Sanskriti School is to date the only student to win the distinction of "Budding Ramanujan" in all three of its editions.
