= Heinrich Zoller =

Swiss botanist (1923–2009)

Coordinates: 47.56788220191676°N 7.642190813398474°E

- Heinrich Zoller in 1986
- Born: January 27, 1923; Basel, Switzerland
- Died: June 11, 2009 (aged 86); Basel, Switzerland
- Resting place: Hörnli cemetery
- Education: University of Bern
- Scientific career
- Fields: Botany: Paleoethnobotany; Palynology; Phytogeography; Phytosociology
- Doctoral students: Christian Körner

Heinrich Zoller (27 January 1923 in Basel – 11 June 2009 in Basel) was a Swiss botanist and professor at the University of Basel.

== Biography ==
From 1942, Zoller studied botany at the University of Basel and at the Rübel Geobotanical Research Institute (ETH Zurich since 1958). He was an assistant to Werner Lüdi between 1945 and 1954. Zoller received his doctorate from the University of Basel in 1952. This was followed by research trips to Finland and Göttingen, whereupon he discovered the herbarium of Albrecht von Haller in the attic of ETH Zurich in 1956. In 1960, Zoller was appointed associate professor at University of Basel. In 1963, Zoller became qualified as a university professor at ETH Zurich, specifically in vegetation history. Between 1967 and 1989, he received 'full professorship ad personam' for botany at the University of Basel, which resulted in him being a mentor of Christian Körner.

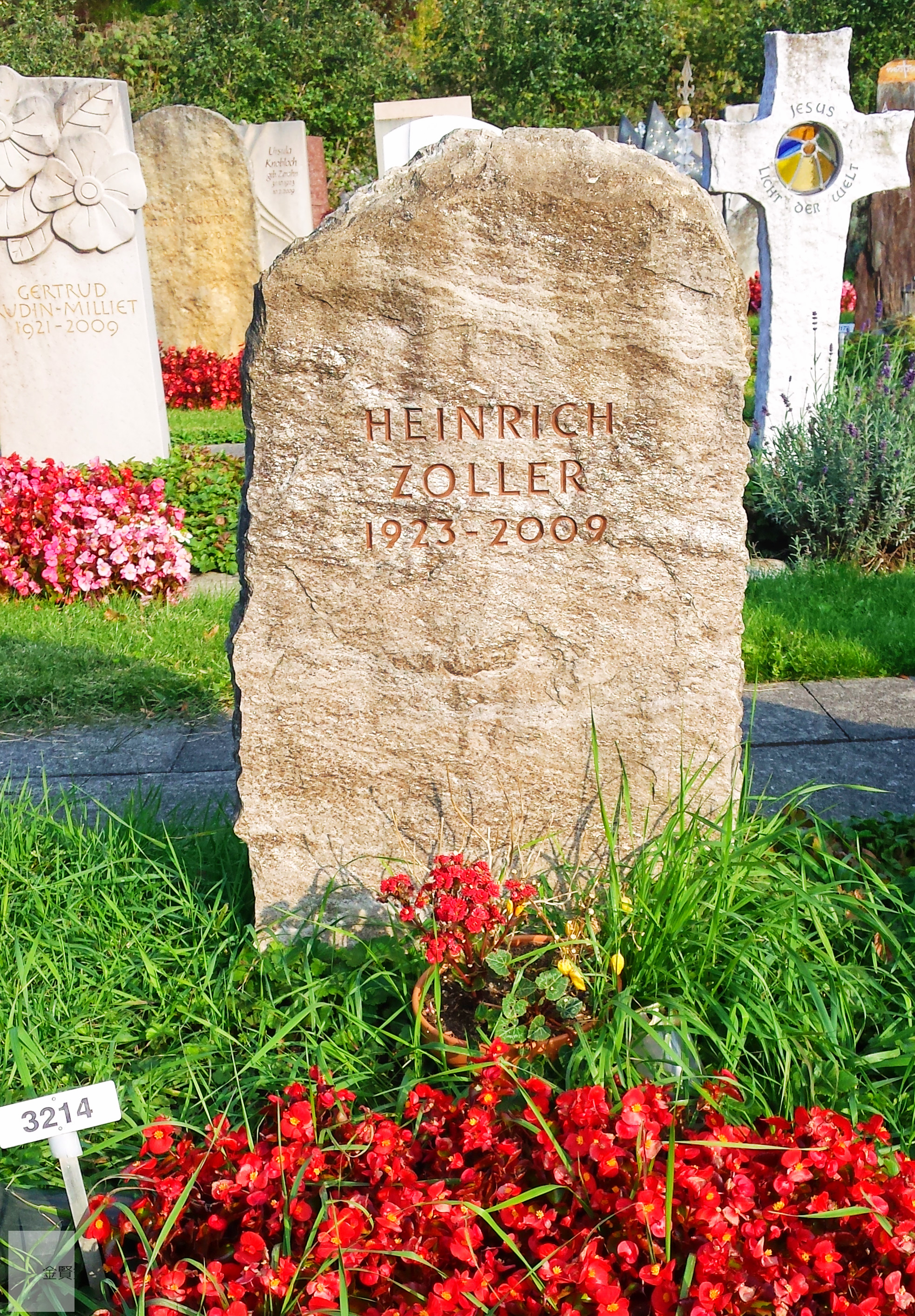
Gravestone of Heinrich Zoller in the cemetery at Hörnli

His grave is in the Hörnli cemetery, the main cemetery of the canton of Basel-Stadt.

== Research ==
In his approximately 200 publications, Zoller mainly dealt with plant geography and sociology, pollen analysis, paleoethnobotany, and the history of botany in Switzerland and Europe. Zoller was a founding member of the Swiss Association for Bryology and Lichenology (part of Scnat since 1992) in 1956. He became its second president between 1970 and 1974.

Zoller had advised 34 doctoral candidates in the field of botany.

== Personal life ==
Zoller had a deeply felt reverence for life. In addition to botany, he was also interested in philosophy, art, and music, particularly. In his younger years, he had to choose between a career as a singer, studying theology, or studying biology. He was aware that there were limits to scientific knowledge, which is why he always vehemently distanced himself from the one-sidedness of material reductionism. Zoller published essays in which he expressed his philosophical-religious attitude towards nature. One of these essays is entitled Ehrfurcht vor dem Leben – Verantwortung für die Schöpfung (Reverence for Life – Responsibility for Creation).

Zoller had 3 sons and 4 grandchildren, at the time of his death.

Zoller contracted a late case of poliomyelitis as a young adult.
