= Macedonian Ecological Society =

Ecological Society founded in 1972

The Macedonian Ecological Society (MES) was founded in 1972, in what was then known as the Socialist Republic of Macedonia.

== Principal tasks and goals ==
- Encourage the development of ecological scientific disciplines in North Macedonia
- Promote the improvement of ecological and environmental education in the Macedonian education system
- Raise public environmental awareness
- Draw attention to environmental problems and, using scientific arguments, stimulate public pressure on institutions and authorities to invest in environmental protection enterprises
- Provide expert assistance to the Macedonian Government in establishing legislative environmental policy
- Promote monitoring systems and follow-up for environment quality in North Macedonia
- Nature conservation with special emphasis on biodiversity

== Principal activities in recent years ==
- Complex ecological investigations in the beech forests in Mavrovo National Park 1997-2000
- Balkan Bear Carnivores Conservation Network (BALKAN NET) - (Led by Arcturos, Greece)
- TEDDY Project (Led by Arcturos, Greece)
- Symposium "Sustainable development of transboundary Prespa region," Prespa, 2000
- "Integrated Preservation of the Balkan Wolf Population by Diminishing the Human-Carnivore Conflict and Altering the Attitudes towards the Wolf", 2000. MES partnered with the Bulgarian Wilderness Fund and the Albanian Society for the Protection of Birds and Mammals (ASPBM)
- ECO-NET: Creation of a network for legal protection and management of protected areas in the southern Balkans, in cooperation with Arcturos (Greece), Journalist Environmental Center - ERINA (North Macedonia) and NGOs from Bulgaria, Albania and Yugoslavia (Project in the frame of DAC) (unclear), 2001–2002
- "BEZFOS" - Use of phosphate-free detergents in the Lake Ohrid regions of Ohrid and Struga (led by Farmahem (Pharmachem, Skopje), 2003.
- Vulture conservation project, North Macedonia, 2003-
- Preparation of an Action Plan for sustainable development of the village of Galicnik, 2005
- Balkan Green belt as ecological corridor for the bear, wolf and lynx: Jablanica Mountain, 2005
- Balkan Lynx Recovery Programme - Macedonia – 2006
