= European Ecological Federation =

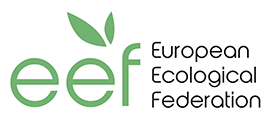
- Abbreviation: EEF
- Formation: 1989
- Founded at: Siena
- Purpose: promote ecological science
- Members: 17 (2014)
- Official language: English
- Leader: Cristina Máguas
- Main organ: council
- Publication: Web Ecology
- Website: www.europeanecology.org

The European Ecological Federation (EEF) is the umbrella organisation of specialist ecological learned societies in Europe.

== Tasks ==
The EEF aims to be a forum for ecological science in Europe and at the same time a link organisation to other continents or international ecological organisations (e.g. INTERCOL). To this end, it primarily aims to increase cooperation between national organisations, which is why only associations are members. Only individuals without a national organisation can become members directly.

== Work ==
To increase co-operation, the EEF supports conferences and publishes its own journal. In addition, the EEF acts in an advisory capacity for European institutions. It responds to requests from the European Commission, proposes experts for advisory committees and invites political decision-makers to conferences in order to promote the exchange between science and politics.

=== Journal ===
The EEF publishes the journal Web Ecology since 2000 (ISSN 1399-1183). The journal publishes research articles via diamond open access from all fields of ecology. The Impact Factor (2024) is 1,5 and the journal ranks 125th of 469 ecology journals.

=== Ernst Haeckel Prize ===
Since 2011, the EEF awards persons with the Ernst Haeckel Prize for extraordinary contributions to European ecological research.

Jahr	Name	Land
2024	Helena Freitas	Portugal
2022	Jens-Christian Svenning	Denmark
2018	Miguel Araújo	Portugal
2017	Carlos M. Herrera	Spain
2015	Riccardo Valentini	Italy
2013	Ernst-Detlef Schulze	Germany
2011	Georgina Mace	Germany

== Members ==
The federation represents 17 learned societies of ecology from over 20 countries with about 8,000 members (status 2014)

List (Status 2021):

- British Ecological Society (BES), United Kingdom and Ireland
- Czech Union of Ecologists (CSPE), Czech Republic
- Ecological Association of Terrestrial Ecology (AEET), Spain
- Ecology and Evolutionary Biology Association (ekoevo), Turkey
- Estonian Naturalists’ Society (ELS), Estonia
- Gesellschaft für Ökologie, Germany, Austria, Switzerland, and Liechtenstein
- Hellenic Ecological Society (HELECOS), Greece
- Hungarian Ecological Society (MÖTE), Hungary
- Irish Ecological Association (IEA) associated to British Ecological Society, Ireland
- Macedonian Ecological Society, North Macedonia
- Netherlands-Flemish Ecological Society (NecoV), Netherlands and Flanders
- Nordic Society Oikos (NSO), Nordic countries
- Polish Ecological Society Petecol, Poland
- Romanian Ecological Society (SRE), Romania
- Slovak Ecological Society (SEKOS), Slovakia
- Sociatá Italiana di Ecologia (S.It.E), Italy
- Société Française d'Ecologie, France and Belgium
- Sociedade Portuguesa de Ecologia (SPECO), Portugal
- Société Française d’Écologie et d’Évolution (sfe²), France and Belgium
- Society of Biological Sciences in Cyprus (SBSCy), Cyprus

== History ==
Presidents
Name	Begin	End
Cristina Máguas		
Stefan Klotz	2006	
Pehr Henrik Enckell	2002	2006
John Pantis	1999	2002
Piet Nienhuis	1995	1999
Reinhard Bornkamm	1993	1995
Robert James Berry	1990	1992

Conference
Year	Location	Country	Partner organisations
2024	Lund	Sweden	NSO
2022	Metz	France	GfÖ, sfe²
2019	Lissabon	Portugal	SPECO
2017	Gent	Belgium	BES, GfÖ, NecoV
2015	Rom	Italy	S.It.E
2011	Ávila	Spain	AEET, SPECO
1998	Groningen	Netherlands	
