= Plant–animal interaction =

Relationships between plants and animals

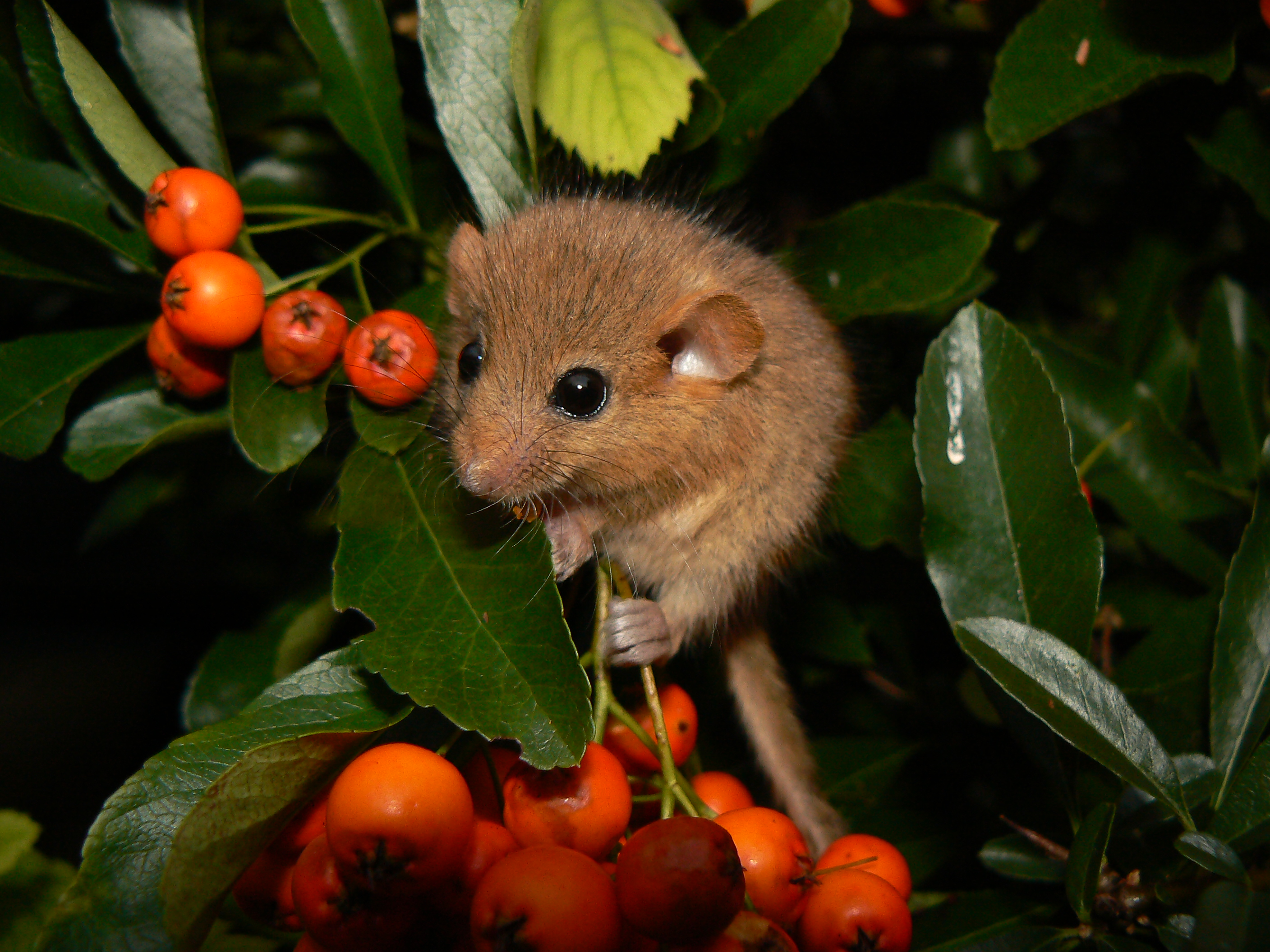
Frugivory is an example of plant-animal interaction

Plant-animal interactions are antagonistic and mutualistic relationships and dynamics between plants and animals in an ecosystem. Plants have evolved defenses to protect themselves from herbivores that in response evolve adaptations to override these defenses. For hundreds of millions of years, animals and plants have co-existed successfully.

== Evolution ==
Vascular plants first evolved on land about 425 million years ago; animals had evolved a wide array of plant-related hunting strategies only around 100 million years after they began feeding on plants. Insects in particular fed on plants in their earliest interactions, and became pollinators by 300 million years ago. Boosting defenses that are easier to produce and more effective against herbivores is an evolutionary adaption plants evolved; this forces animals to respond by evolving adaptations to these defenses.

== Relationship ==
According to the theory of predator–prey interactions, the relationship between herbivores and plants is cyclic. When prey (plants) are numerous their predators (herbivores) increase in numbers, reducing the prey population, which in turn causes predator number to decline.

Several factors play into these fluctuating populations and help stabilize predator-prey dynamics. For example, spatial heterogeneity is maintained, which means there will always be pockets of plants not found by herbivores. This stabilizing dynamic plays an especially important role for specialist herbivores that feed on one species of plant and prevents these specialists from wiping out their food source. Prey defenses also help stabilize predator-prey dynamics, and for more information on these relationships see the section on Plant Defenses. Eating a second prey type helps herbivores' populations stabilize. Alternating between two or more plant types provides population stability for the herbivore, while the populations of the plants oscillate. This plays an important role for generalist herbivores that eat a variety of plants. Keystone herbivores keep vegetation populations in check and allow for a greater diversity of both herbivores and plants. When an invasive herbivore or plant enters the system, the balance is thrown off and the diversity can collapse to a monotaxon system.

The back and forth relationship of plant defense and herbivore offense drives coevolution between plants and herbivores, resulting in a "coevolutionary arms race". The escape and radiation mechanisms for coevolution, presents the idea that adaptations in herbivores and their host plants, has been the driving force behind speciation.

While much of the interaction of herbivory and plant defense is negative, with one individual reducing the fitness of the other, some is beneficial. This beneficial herbivory takes the form of mutualisms in which both partners benefit in some way from the interaction. Seed dispersal by herbivores and pollination are two forms of mutualistic herbivory in which the herbivore receives a food resource and the plant is aided in reproduction. Plants can also be indirectly affected by herbivores through nutrient recycling, with plants benefiting from herbivores when nutrients are recycled very efficiently. Another form of plant-herbivore mutualism is physical changes to the environment and/or plant community structure by herbivores which serve as ecosystem engineers, such as wallowing by bison. Swans form a mutual relationship with the plant species that they forage by digging and disturbing the sediment which removes competing plants and subsequently allows colonization of other plant species.
