= Aram Miskaryan =

Aram Miskaryan (29 November 1973 – 22 June 2009) was an Armenian sportsman and President of the Armenian Mu Tay Federation. Aram Miskaryan was also popular actor. He died as a result of a car accident on the Ejmiatsin-Armavir highway in Armenia. He was 36. He was not married. Also dead on the same incident was another Armenian actor Gegham Ghandilyan.

Aram Miskaryan was best known for his role as "Garik" on the television series "Vorogayt" (Trap), a series based on gangster life.
