= Lore Steubing =

German botanist

- Born: February 1, 1922
- Died: January 1, 2012 (aged 89)
- Other name: Eleonore Steubing
- Known for: Botany

Lore Steubing (or Eleonore Steubing) was a German botanist, generally an ecologist, born on February 1, 1922. She was former head of Chair of Plant Ecology in the Department of Biology at University of Giessen in Giessen. Steubing died on January 1, 2012, because of a travel accident, in the Augsburg Clinic.

In 1958, she had gone to Giessen from stations in Berlin, Greifswald and Potsdam where she had become an assistant at the University's Botanical Institute.

Her research includes articles such as "Mercury in soil and plants from a geological perspective" from January 1991. Lore Steubing has also been an advocate to an international research group and has carried out many trips to countries. She has also set up research networks – China, Chile, China, Colombia, Hungary and the Central African Republic are some examples. In 1982, she was awarded the "German Environmental Protection Prize" for her efforts. Steubing has taught ecophysiology courses in native ecosystem plants in Chile.
