= Anil Wilson =

Indian educationalist (1947–2009)

Dr. Anil Wilson

Anil Wilson (21 October 1947 – 25 June 2009) was an Indian educationist who served as Principal of St. Stephen's College, Delhi from 1991 to 2007.

Anil Wilson's father, M. M. Wilson, was a school Headmaster in Gorton Mission School Kotgarh, and worked as a teacher of English and House Master at Bishop Cotton School in Shimla, Himachal Pradesh. Anil Wilson was educated by the Irish Christian Brothers at St. Edward's School, Shimla He graduated from Panjab University, later earning a master's degree in English Literature from the Centre for Post Graduate Studies, Shimla. He was selected by the Public Service Commission to work as a lecturer in Colleges in Mandi, Himachal Pradesh. During his early years as lecturer he went on to obtain his M.Phil and his Ph.D. He was awarded Ph.D. on his dissertation on the nobel laureate, Isaac Bashevis Singer's fiction titled "The Art and Vision of Isaac Bashevis Singer: An Interpretation".

In January 1991 he was selected to head St. Stephen's College, Delhi. Wilson was the eleventh Principal of the prestigious institute and the first to have been appointed without prior teaching experience at the same college. Throughout his tenure as Principal, however, he continued to serve as a lecturer in English to all three years of the undergraduate honours programme.

In 1996 he was appointed Pro Vice-Chancellor of the Himachal Pradesh University where he also officiated as the Vice Chancellor, but before he could complete his term there he was recalled by St. Stephen's College. In 2002 he founded Mathematical Sciences Foundation, Delhi, and was its Founder Chairman. He was later appointed as regular vice chancellor of Himachal Pradesh University, Shimla in 2007. He continued in this position until January 2008, when he had to quit on account of his failing health.

== Awards ==
Anil Wilson received numerous awards from various organizations and bodies, including:

- The Beresford Hope Award (1984; from St. Augustine's Foundation, England)
- Soka University Award of Highest Honour (1992)
- The Distinguished Educationist Award (2001)

== Affiliations ==
He was associated in academic and administrative capacities with a number of universities and colleges abroad including University of the Philippines, University of Macao, Christ Church College Canterbury, University of California at Berkeley and Westcott House Cambridge (UK). He participated in conferences and symposia at a number of universities abroad including Brown University (USA), Soka University (Japan), National University of Malaysia (Kuala Lumpur), University of Macao, Thammasat University (Bangkok), et al. He was a founder member of the SRG Medical College in Mauritius.

== Membership ==
Wilson served as a member of number of national boards and committees:

- Nominated by President of India to the Executive Committee of the North Eastern Hill University (Shillong)
- Nominee of Governor of Jharkhand on the Executive Council of the Birla Institute of Technology, (Mesra, Ranchi).
- Executive Council of the University of Delhi
- Member, SAARC committee on Cultural Activities
- Trustee, Muhammad Abdus Salam Foundation (London)
- Advisory Panel

State Board for Higher Education of Madhya Pradesh
State Advisory Board of Higher Education Himachal Pradesh

- Senate, Serampore University
- Member, Executive Committee of the Council for the Indian School Certificate Examinations

== Death ==
Wilson was diagnosed with pancreatic cancer in October 2008. He donated his organs for further medical research on the disease. He died on 25 June 2009 and was buried at the Nicholson Cemetery in Delhi. He was survived by his mother Mrs. D Wilson, wife Rita (an educationist herself), son Amit, daughter-in-law Pooja and daughter Aparna.
