= HMS Royal Arthur =

One ship and one shore establishment of the Royal Navy have borne the name HMS Royal Arthur, in reference to the legendary King Arthur:

- HMS Royal Arthur (1891) was an Edgar-class armoured cruiser launched in 1891 and sold in 1921.
- HMS Royal Arthur (shore establishment) was a training centre established near Skegness between 1939 and 1946, and at Corsham between 1947 and 1993.
