= Tōshirō Ishida =

Tōshirō Ishida (石田 東四郎, Ishida Tōshirō; August 1912 – June 25, 2009) was a former Japanese military employee. Drafted in 1937, he was sent to China in order to gain information for the Imperial Japanese Army, but went missing, eventually being declared dead in 1963. He was found living in the Chinese province of Henan in 1993, suffering from amnesia, and returned to Japan that year.

In 1993, a Hyogo-based civilian group got information about a Japanese man living in Henan Province. DNA testing identified the man as Ishida. He returned to Japan the same year.

His family said Ishida had been suffering from amnesia after receiving a bullet wound to the head during the war.

He died of pneumonia in 2009.
