= John Anthony (sport shooter) =

British sports shooter

Personal information
- Born: 4 December 1932 Romford, Essex, England
- Died: 16 June 2009 (aged 76)

Sport
- Sport: Sports shooting

John Anthony (4 December 1932 – 16 June 2009) was a British sports shooter. He competed at the 1972 Summer Olympics and the 1976 Summer Olympics.
