= Wilderness Fund =

- Founded: October 30, 1989; Sofia, Bulgaria
- Founders: Geko Spiridonov; Lyubomir Ivanov; Solomon Passy
- Type: Charitable trust
- Purpose: Environmentalism
- Location: Sofia, Bulgaria
- Region served: World wide
- Method: Lobbying, research, consultancy

The Wilderness Fund is a Bulgarian non-governmental organization for the conservation, research and restoration of the environment established on 30 October 1989. Member of the International Union for Conservation of Nature (IUCN), awarded the Ford Foundation prize for natural heritage protection in 1997.

== See also ==
- IUCN
- Conservation movement
- Environmental movement
- Natural environment
- Sustainability
