= Nina Buchmann =

Plant ecologist

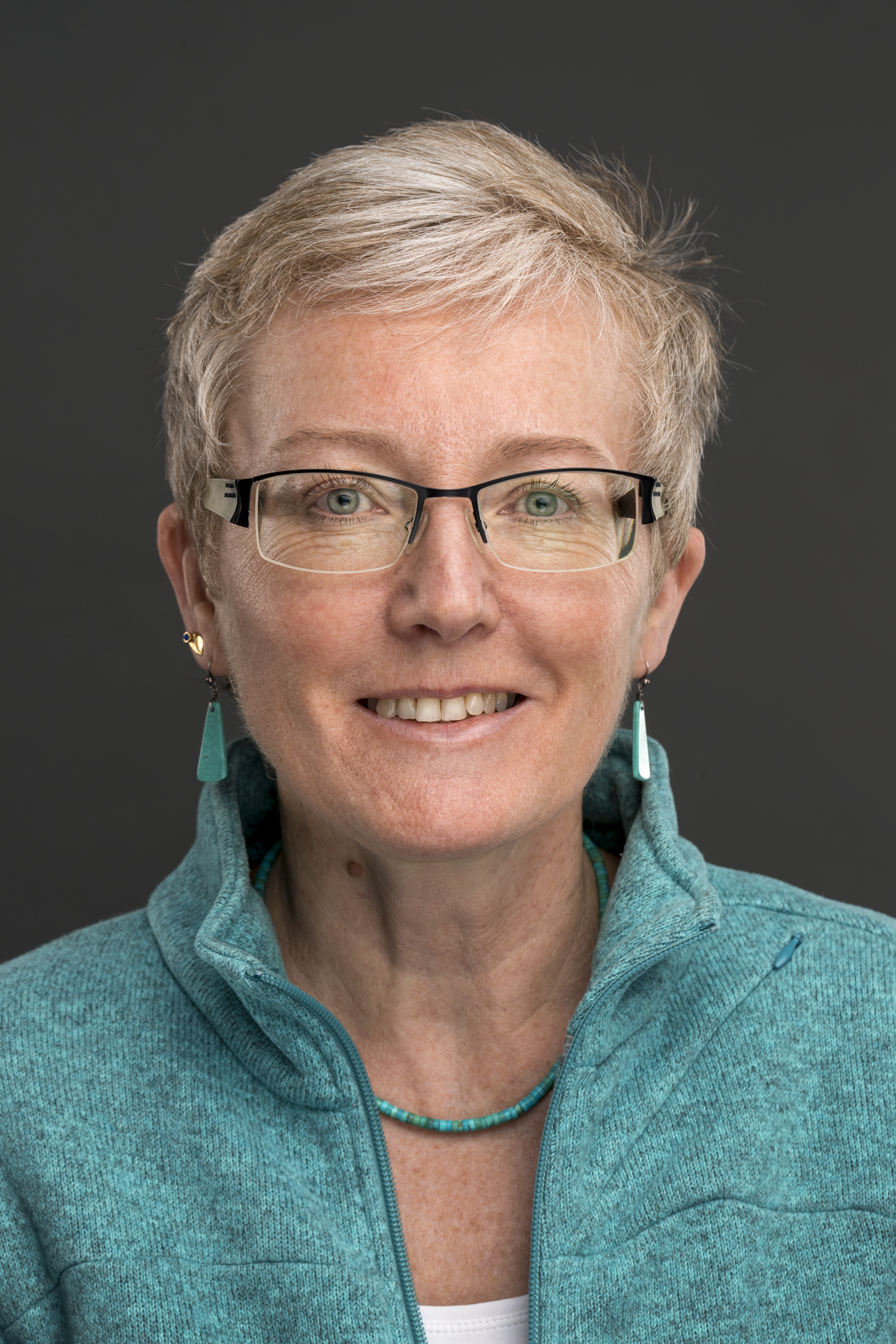
- Born: July 18, 1965; Heidelberg, Germany
- Education: University of Bayreuth
- Scientific career
- Thesis: Wege und Umsetzungen von 15N-Ammonium und 15N-Nitrat in einem Fichtenjungbestand (Picea abies (L.) Karst.) (1993)

Nina Buchmann is a German ecologist known for her research on the ecophysiology of plants and on the biosphere-atmosphere greenhouse gas exchange of terrestrial ecosystems. She is a member of the German National Academy of Sciences Leopoldina and an elected fellow of the American Geophysical Union. She was elected a Member of the National Academy of Sciences in 2025.

== Education and career ==
Buchmann has an undergraduate degree in geoecology from the University of Bayreuth (1989). In 1993 she finished her Ph.D. there working with Ernst-Detlief Schulze with a research project tracking the incorporation of inorganic nitrogen into trees. Following this, she spent three years at the University of Utah working with James Ehleringer. In 1996 she returned to the University of Bayreuth and finished her habilitation working on the exchange of carbon dioxide between soils and the atmosphere. Starting in 1993, she worked at the Max Planck Institute for Biogeochemistry until she moved to ETH Zurich in 2003 where she is a full professor. From 2011 to 2017, she was Founding Chair of the World Food System Centre at ETH Zurich, from August 2012 to July 2017 Vice Head of Department and from August 2017 to July 2021 Head of the Department of Environmental Systems Science at ETH Zurich Department of Environmental Systems Science at ETH Zurich, Switzerland. In the ranking of the “best female scientists in the world” 2024, Nina Buchmann is among the top 6 in Switzerland.

In 2007, she was elected into the National Academy of Sciences of Germany (Leopoldina). In 2018, she was elected a fellow of the American Geophysical Union who cited "her pioneering work to understand ecophysiological mechanisms regulating ecosystem carbon dynamics locally, regionally and across diverse ecosystems". In 2018 and 2019, she was recognized as a "Highly Cited Researcher".

== Research ==
The main research topics of Nina Buchmann include plant and ecosystem physiology, biogeochemistry of terrestrial ecosystems, particularly the response of soil and ecosystem carbon, nitrogen and water dynamics to climatic conditions and management regimes and interactions among biodiversity, ecosystem functions/services, and sustainable resource use. She published more than 400 refereed original journal papers and 40 books and book chapters (as of 2024), and is member of several Scientific Steering Committees and Advisory Boards.

=== Selected publications ===
- Schulze, Ernst-Detlef; Beck, Erwin; Buchmann, Nina; Clemens, Stephan; Müller-Hohenstein, Klaus; Scherer-Lorenzen, Michael (2019). Plant Ecology (2 ed.). Berlin, Germany: Springer-Verlag. ISBN 978-3-662-56231-4.
- Scientific Publicationen at Web of Science
- Overview of publications at researchgate

== Awards (selection) ==
- 2025: International member in the National Academy of Sciences
- 2024: Best Scholars in the field of Ecology and Evolution in the World 2023, 2024
- 2024: Best Female Scientists in the World 2022, 2023, 2024 Ranking
- 2022: Honorary Medal of Gesellschaft für Ökologie
- 2022: Distinguished Alumna der University of Utah, School of Biological Sciences
- 2018, 2019: Highly Cited Researcher
- 2018: Fellow der American Geophysical Union
- 2014–2017: Member of Agroscope-Scientific Advisory Board
- 2012: Norbert Gerbier-MUMM International Award of the World Meteorological Organization
- 2011: Founding Chair of the World Food System Centre
- 2007: Member of the National Academy of Sciences Leopoldina
- 2007: Award "Das Goldene Dreirad / Golden Tricycle" for the most family and staff friendly leader at ETH Zürich
- 2000: Founding member of Junge Akademie (Young Academy of Sciences) (2000–2005)
