= Enterprise environmental factor =

External factors in project management

In project management, Enterprise environmental factors are the factors that originate from outside of the project or organization. These factors can impact projects, programs or portfolios and are outside the control of the project team.

These factors can either impact positively or negatively and they cannot be controlled by the project team.

== Conditions ==
These factors can come from internal or external conditions to the organization. Internal factors to the organization can be the organizational structure, geographical distribution of resources, infrastructure, information technology software, resource availability and employee capability.

Some enterprise environmental factors are external to the organization, such as marketplace conditions, legal restrictions, commercial database, academic research, government of industry standards, financial considerations and physical environmental elements.
