= Om Prakash Aditya =

Hindi poet and satirist

- Born: 5 November 1936; Gurugram, Haryana, India
- Died: 8 June 2009 (aged 72); Near Bhopal, Madhya Pradesh, India
- Known for: Chhand Hasya Poems

Om Prakash Aditya (5 November 1936 – 8 June 2009) was a renowned Hindi poet and satirist. He was also a famous poet of Hindi Kavi Sammelan. He was widely known for his witty and satiric poems. "Gori Bethi Chhat Par", "Idhar Bhi Gadhe Hain, Udhar Bhi Gadhe Hain", "Tota And Maina" are some of his famous poems. He was also one of the few poets in modern Hindi literature who used Kavita Chand to say poems. Chhand, which, in ancient times, was a part of almost every poet has now been very rare. Aditya was one of those very few poets who used Chhand in all poems.

A product of the pre-cable-television era, he achieved fame with televised Hasya Kavi Sammelan on Doordarshan in the 1970s and 1980s.

He was also a school teacher in Delhi. He died in a car accident near Bhopal, Madhya Pradesh, India.
