= Gegham Ghandilyan =

Armenian actor

Gegham Khandilyan (Armenian: Գեղամ Խանդիլյան, 14 October 1974 – 22 June 2009) was an Armenian television actor. He died as a result of a car accident on the Ejmiatsin-Armavir highway in Armenia. He was 35. He was not married. Also dead on the same incident was another Armenian actor Aram Miskaryan

Gegham Khandilyan was best known for his role as "Gokor" on the television series "Vorogayt" (Trap), a series based on gangster life.
