= Thomas M. King =

American theologian (1929–2009)

The Reverend Thomas M. King SJ
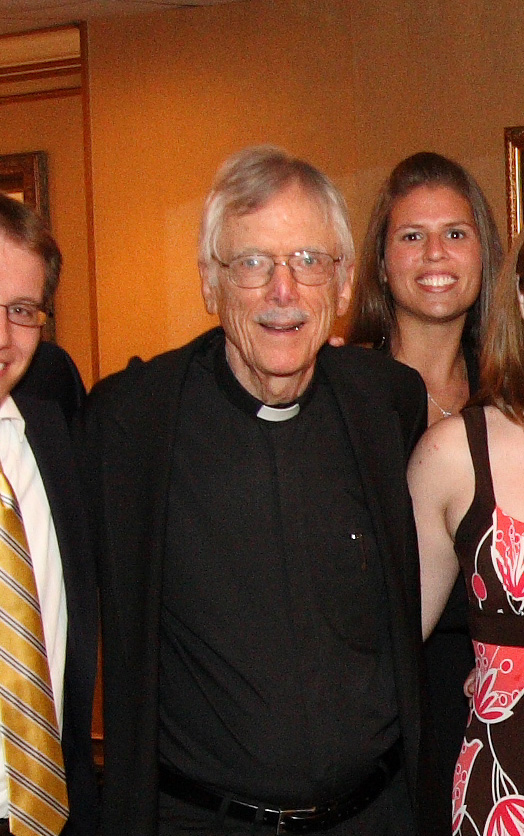
- Born: May 9, 1929; Pittsburgh, Pennsylvania
- Died: June 23, 2009 (aged 80); Washington, DC
- Occupations: Theologian, Priest, Jesuit
- Writing career
- Notable works: Jung's Four and Some Philosophers, Teilhard's Mass

Thomas Mulvihill King, S.J. (May 9, 1929 in Pittsburgh, Pennsylvania – June 23, 2009 in Washington, D.C.) was a professor of theology at Georgetown University. King entered the Society of Jesus in 1951 and roteor edited several books on Pierre Teilhard de Chardin, including Teilhard's Mysticism of Knowing (1981), Teilhard and the Unity of Knowledge (1983) Teilhard de Chardin (1988), The Letters of Teilhard de Chardin and Lucile Swan (1993) and Teilhard's Mass (2005).

== Impact at Georgetown University ==
Father King was also well known among Georgetown students and alumni for offering Mass at 11:15 p.m. each night from Sunday to Friday in Dahlgren Chapel on Georgetown's main campus, a tradition he started in 1969. In 1999, The Hoya, Georgetown's student newspaper, declared King "Georgetown's Man of the Century", noting that "no one has had a more significant presence on campus and effect on students than Father King.". In addition, Father King was presented as third in a series of cover stories regarding Jesuit identity in the Georgetown Voice on September 27, 2001.

== Political positions ==
In line with Catholic moral teaching, he took a strong stance against abortion and euthanasia and was the co-founder of the University Faculty of Life, a group that seeks to create dialogue on life issues in the academic community. King was also a member of Pax Christi and opposed war and capital punishment, though he stressed the peaceful prevention of conflict over strict pacifism.

== Final days ==
Fr. King turned 80 on May 9, 2009. Many different groups of friends, colleagues, and former students came together to celebrate his 80th birthday and 40 years of 11:15 pm Mass over the months of May and June. On June 23, 2009, King died of heart attack in his bedroom at the Jesuit Residence at Georgetown University in Washington, D.C.

== Books written or edited ==
- Teilhard's Mass: Approaches to "The Mass on the World". Mahwah, NJ: Paulist, 2005.
- Jung's Four and Some Philosophers: A Paradigm for Philosophy. Notre Dame: University of Notre Dame Press, 1999.
- The Letters of Teilhard de Chardin and Lucile Swan. Editor, with Mary Gilbert. Washington, DC: Georgetown Univ Pr, 1993.
- Merton: Mystic at the Center of America. Collegeville, Minn: Liturgical Pr, 1992.
- Enchantments: Religion and the Power of the Word. Kansas City, Mo: Sheed & Ward, 1989.
- Teilhard de Chardin. Wilmington, Del: Michael Glazier, 1988.
- Teilhard and the Unity of Knowledge. Editor, with James F. Salmon. New York: Paulist Pr, 1983.
- Teilhard's Mysticism of Knowing. New York: Seabury Pr, 1981.
- Sartre and the Sacred. Chicago: Univ of Chicago Pr, 1974.

== Journal articles and book chapters ==
- "Reflection from a Roman Catholic Priest." In Hail Mary and Rhythmic Breathing: A New Way of Praying the Rosary, vii-viii. Mahwah, New Jersey: Paulist Press, 2006.
- "Believers and their disbelief." Zygon 42, no. 3 (September 2007): 779–791.
- "The Thomas Merton Encyclopedia." Theological Studies 67, no. 4 (December 2006): 931–932.
- "God and the Human Future." In Teilhard and the Future of Humanity, 20–28. New York: Fordham University Press, 2006.
- "An atheist on the 'compost of Catholicity': remembering Jean-Paul Sartre on his centennial." National Catholic Reporter 41, no. 32 (June 17, 2005): 18.
- "Scientific Research as Adoration: Pierre Teilhard de Chardin (1881-1955)." The Way 44, no. 3 (July 2005): 21–34.
- "Teilhard makes Christianity most exciting thing on block." National Catholic Reporter 41, no. 25 (April 22, 2005): 8–10.
- "Teilhard and the environment." Ecotheology 10, no. 1 (April 2005): 88–98.
- "A Holy Man and Lover of the World: the spirituality of Teilhard de Chardin." America 192, no. 11 (March 28, 2005): 7–10.
- Forward. In The Divine Milieu, vii-xxvi. Portland: Sussex Academic Press, 2004.
- "Teilhard's unity of knowledge." In Teilhard in the 21st Century, 33–43. Maryknoll, NY: Orbis Books, 2003.
- "Globalization and the soul: according to Teilhard, Friedman, and others." Zygon 37, no. 1 (March 2002): 25–33.
- "Teilhard and Globalization." Theology Digest 40, no. 3 (2002): 211–215.
- "Le Salut du Monde selon Teilhard de Chardin (The Salvation of the World According to Teilhard de Chardin)." In Le sens de l'évolution en question? : Colloque international Teilhard de Chardin, 2001, Lille-Hastings, Saint-Etienne: Aubin, 2002.
- "Virtual Faith: The Irreverent Spiritual Quest of Generation X (Book Review)." Theological Studies 60, no. 3 (September 1999): 587.
- "Jung and Catholic Spirituality." America 180, no. 11 (April 1999): 12–15.
- "Karl Barth And Thomas Merton Climbing Church Towers At Night." America 179, no. 19 (December 12, 1998): 12–14.
- "Work on Teilhard, 1980-1994 : An Annotated Bibliography." With James F. Salmon. Zygon 30, no. 1 (March 1995): 131–142.
- "An Explosion of Dazzling Flashes : Teilhard's Unity of Faith and Science." Zygon 30, no. 1 (March 1995): 105–115.
- "The consecration of our world in the spiritual exercises of Ignatius." Journal of Spiritual Formation 15, no. 3 (November 1994): 273.
- "Thomas Merton: The Development of a Spiritual Theologian." Theological Studies 47, no. 3 (September 1986): 546–547.
- "The Milieux Teilhard left behind." America 152 (March 1985): 249–254.
- "A Writer Loses Himself: A Study of Thomas Merton." Chicago Studies 24, no. 1 (1985): 69–86.
- "A sermon for Teilhard's Mass on the world." In Teilhard and the Unity of Knowledge, 150–152. Ramsey, NJ: Paulist Press, 1983.
- "Appendix : Teilhard and Piltdown." In Teilhard and the Unity of Knowledge, 159–169. Ramsey, NJ: Paulist Press, 1983.
- "The Teilhard centennial." America 146, no. 16 (April 1982): 318–319.
- "Atheism of Jean-Paul Sartre." In God in Contemporary Thought, 851–863. New York: Learned Pub, 1977.

== Book reviews ==
- "Boredom and the Religious Imagination (Book Review)." Theological Studies 61, no. 4 (December 2000): 799.
- "Religion and the Spiritual in Carl Jung (Book Review)." Theological Studies 61, no. 2 (June 2000): 392.
- "Wounded Prophet: A Portrait of Henri J. M. Nouwen (Book Review)." Theological Studies 60, no. 4 (December 1999): 792.
- "Nearer My God: An Autobiography of Faith (Book Review)." America 178, no. 3 (January 31, 1998): 32–39.
- "The Phenomenon of Teilhard: Prophet for a New Age (Book Review)." Theological Studies 58, no. 1 (March 1997): 193.
- "Searching for Christ: The Spirituality of Dorothy Day (Book Review)." Theological Studies 56, no. 1 (March 1995): 169.
- "Silent Lamp: The Thomas Merton Story (Book Review)." Theological Studies 54, no. 1 (March 1993): 199.
- "Thomas Merton's Art of Denial: The Evolution of a Radical Humanist (Book Review)." Theological Studies 51, no. 1 (March 1990): 178.
- "Up and Down Merton's Mountain: A Contemporary Spiritual Journey (Book Review)." Books and Religion 16, (1989): 9.
- "Thomas Merton: The Ongoing Story; A Vow of Conversation (Book Review)." Books and Religion 16, (1989): 9.
- "New seeds for Merton contemplation (Book Review)." Books and Religion 16, (1989): 9.
- "Thomas Merton in Alaska (Book Review)." Books and Religion 16, (1989): 9.
- "Thomas Merton on Nuclear Weapons (Book Review)." Books and Religion 16, (1989): 9.
- "Honorable Reader (Book Review)." Books and Religion 16, (1989): 9.
- "Thomas Merton (Book Review)." Theological Studies 47, no. 3 (September 1986): 546–547.
- "A Reason to Hope: A Synthesis of Teilhard de Chardin's Vision and Systems Thinking (Book Review)." Theological Studies 45, no. 2 (June 1984): 395–396.
- "The Cosmic Christ in Origen and Teilhard de Chardin (Book Review)." Theological Studies 44, no. 2 (June 1983): 324–325.
- "Evolution from space (Book Review)." America 147 (October 1982): 238–239.
- "The spirit of the earth (Book Review)." America 145 (December 1981): 407–408.
- "Teilhard, Scripture, and Revelation (Book Review)." Theological Studies 42, no. 4 (December 1981): 690–691.
- "Towards a New Mysticism (Book Review)." Theological Studies 42, no. 2 (June 1981): 318–320.
- "The Heart of Matter (Book Review)." Theological Studies 40, no. 4 (December 1979): 760–762.
- "Exercises in Religious Understanding (Book Review)." Theological Studies 36, no. 3 (September 1975): 533–534.
- "Jung, Gods, and Modern Man (Book Review)." Theological Studies 32, no. 3 (September 1971): 554–555.
