= Antonio Bianco =

Antonio "Nino" Bianco (26 December 1951 – 15 June 2009) was a South African scientist of Italian ancestry.

Bianco, who was born into a family of gemstone cutters, moved to the United States in 1976. He was especially well known for cutting large diamonds, including a significant number of stones weighing more than 100 carats (20 g) when cut, including the "Dream Diamond", a 100-carat (20 g) fancy colored yellow diamond he produced for the Graff diamond company in 2006, with estimated value at the time of £13 million.

Bianco died of cancer on 15 June 2009.
