= Gordon Taylor (Royal Navy chaplain) =

Gordon Clifford Taylor
- Born: 24 October 1915; Wigan, Lancashire, England
- Died: 27 June 2009 (aged 93)
- Military career
- Allegiance: United Kingdom
- Branch: Royal Navy
- Service years: 1940–1946
- Nickname: "Bumper"
- Conflicts: World War II

Gordon "Bumper" Clifford Taylor (24 October 1915 – 27 June 2009) was a Royal Navy chaplain, Anglican priest, author and clergyman, who served as a priest for more than fifty years.

== Early life ==
Taylor was born in Wigan on 24 October 1915. He wished to become a chaplain as early as age 18, but was rejected as too young. He went to Christ's College to study geography and English. He took Holy Orders after studying at Ripon Hall, University of Oxford where he rejected "liberal theology".

== Church and Royal Navy service ==
After graduation he was ordained by Arthur Winnington-Ingram at St. Paul's Cathedral in 1938. He then became a curate at St. Stephen's Ealing. In 1940, he volunteered to become a chaplain in the Royal Navy, and was initially disappointed to be assigned to the stone frigate and former Butlins located at Skegness summer camp HMS Royal Arthur, where new recruits were processed and trained in the Royal Navy. During that time, he buried several men killed by a Luftwaffe air raid. In 1941, he was posted aboard HMS Arrow, which was assigned to Atlantic convoy until he was injured in a fall that damaged his scaphoid bone. After his treatment, he was assigned to South America. He also spent time at two shore assignments, once in Nairobi, where he got permission to build a church by beating the commanding officer at snooker. On returning to home fleet he became the chaplain on HMS Rodney, where she bombarded Cherbourg and Alderney to suppress German Army artillery which was harassing American soldiers. He was then assigned to convoy duty escorting ships into Murmansk.

== Later life ==
Upon demobilization in 1946, Taylor became an assistant master at Eton College. In 1978 he wrote "The Sea Chaplains", which is now the standard history of Royal Navy chaplains. This was followed in 1983 by "London's Navy : a story of the Royal Naval Volunteer Reserve". He died on 27 June 2009, aged 93.He was Rector of St Giles in the fields in Central Lindon for many years
