= Sylvia Levin =

- Born: September 14, 1917; Brooklyn, New York
- Died: June 25, 2009 (aged 91); Los Angeles, California
- Occupation: voter registration activist

Sylvia Levin (September 14, 1917 – June 25, 2009) was an American civic and voter registration activist, who registered more than 47,000 California voters over a span of 36 years from 1973 until 2009. Government experts and analysts believe that her 47,000 voter registration total is a nationwide record in the United States and in the state of California.

Levin, a deputy county registrar, worked without pay on a strictly volunteer basis.

== Biography ==
Levin was born in Brooklyn, New York, on September 14, 1917, and raised in both Brooklyn and New Jersey. She relocated to southern California during the 1940s, eventually settling in Santa Monica. A single mother of two children, Levin held a variety of jobs. She worked in an aircraft plant, garment factory, at the original Los Angeles Farmers Market and as a beach attendant in Santa Monica.

== Voter registration efforts ==
Levin credited her son, Chuck Levin, with sparking her interest in civics and voter participation. Chuck Levin, a Santa Monica writer and political consultant, created the First Vote campaign. The campaign registered young people to vote once the voting age was lowered to 18 years old in 1971 with the adoption of the 26th Amendment to the U.S. Constitution. Sylvia Levin took notice of her son's campaign.

Sylvia Levin began working as a deputy voter registrar outside Canter's Deli in the Fairfax District of Los Angeles in 1973. She gradually expanded her voter registration efforts to several communities throughout Los Angeles County's Westside, including Westwood Village, Malibu, Venice and Westwood.

Levin spent six days a week commuting by bus to reach her work locations. She became a fixture for 36 years outside several locations in the Westside. Levin could be found registering prospective voters at the same locations each week. On Sundays, she worked outside the Westwood Village Farmers' Market. She set up her stand outside the post office at the Federal Building in Westwood on Mondays, Tuesdays and Thursdays. Levin worked outside the post office or a bank in Malibu on Fridays, while on Saturdays she moved to a location outside the Sunya Currie jewelry store on Abbot Kinney in Venice.

In it estimated that Levin registered 47,000 new California voters between 1973 and 2009, an individual record both in the state of California and the United States. Additionally, Levin is believed to have spoken to approximately 470,000 people during the 36 she spent in voter registration.

Levin registered 60 new voters on a single day in 1996, a presidential election year. The number dipped to an average of four new voters a day during the 2000s.

Levin received official recognition for her work. Los Angeles County Supervisor Zev Yaroslavsky awarded Levin a plaque for her "outstanding service" in 1996. The late state Senator Herschel Rosenthal honored Levin with a resolution in the California state senate in 1999. She was also nominated by then California assemblyman Paul Koretz and formally inducted into the California Voter Participation Hall of Fame in 2001.

U.S. Rep. Henry Waxman remarked in the Congressional Record in 1997 that Levin "has done more to increase voter participation than virtually anyone we know."

On Sep 14, 2007, which was Levin's 90th birthday, she was honored in a resolution by the Los Angeles City Council for her state voter registration record and 34 years of volunteer service to her communities. The resolution honoring Levin, which was introduced by Los Angeles City Councilman Bill Rosendahl, read, "the appreciation felt by so many thousands of people have been touched by [her] tireless enthusiasm for voting and who have applauded her commitment."

Levin continued registering new voters right up to the time she was hospitalized on May 18, 2009.

Sylvia Levin died of complications from a stroke at Cedars-Sinai Medical Center in Los Angeles on June 25, 2009, at the age of 91. She was survived by her daughter, Susan Levin, son, Chuck Levin, and two sisters, Dottie Sadowsky and Daisy Neustadt.

On June 30, 2009, L.A. city councilman Bill Rosendahl adjourned the city council proceedings in Levin's memory.
