= Christian Körner =

Austrian-Swiss academic (born 1949)

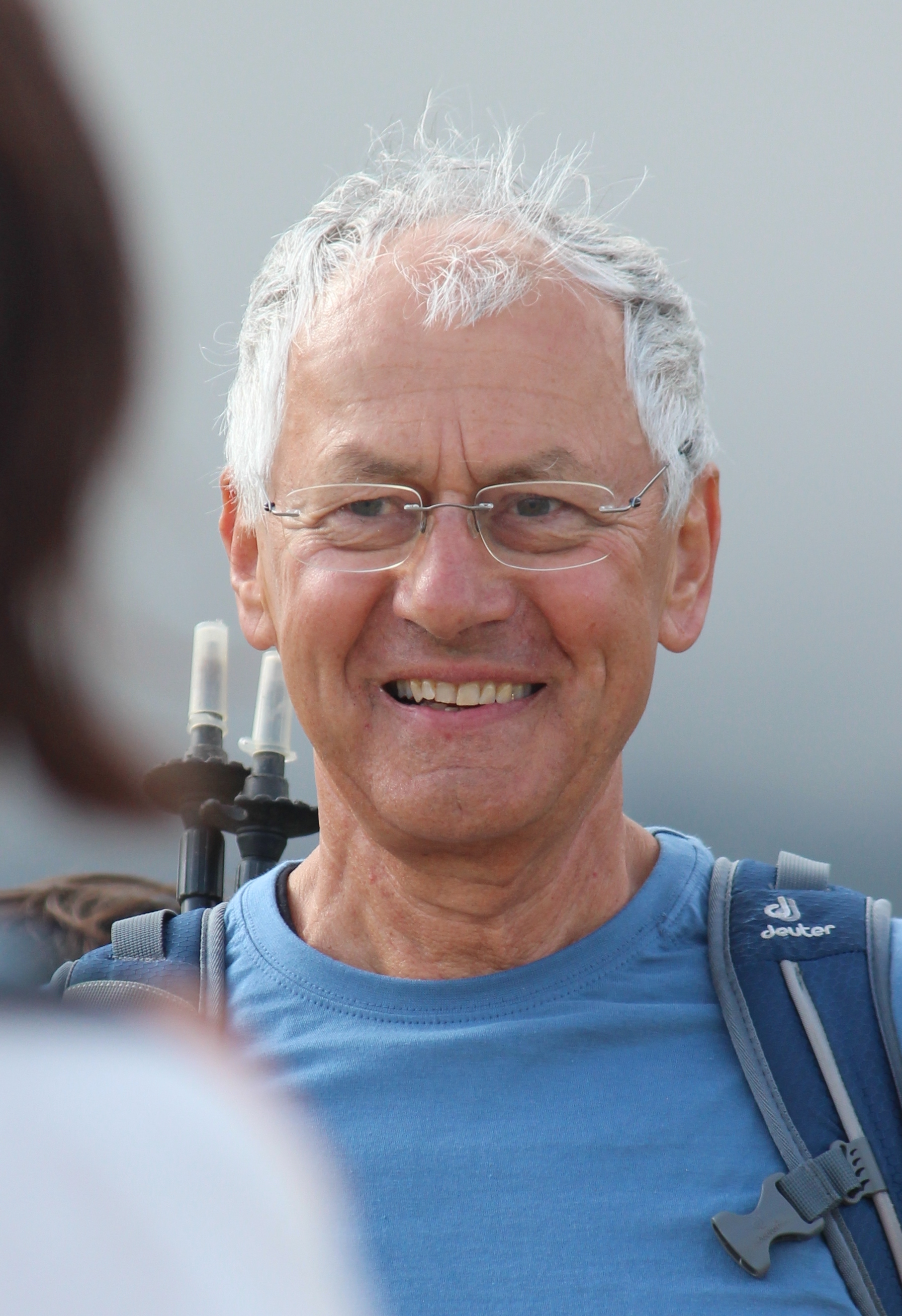
- Born: 29 March 1949 (age 76); Salzburg, Austria
- Citizenship: Austrian / Swiss
- Occupation: Botanist
- Organizations: University of Basel

Christian Körner (born 29 March 1949) is an Austrian–Swiss botanist and emeritus professor at the University of Basel. He is one of the world's most renowned scientists in the field of alpine plant ecology.

== Life ==
Körner was born in Salzburg. Between 1968 and 1973, he studied biology and geosciences at the University of Innsbruck. He completed his PhD on water relations of alpine plants in 1977 at the University of Innsbruck (supervised by Walter Larcher). From 1977 to 1980, he did a Postdoc in the Austrian MAB alpine program (alpine water cycle, hydrology) and field work in the Caucasus (Georgia), followed by research stays (1981, 1989) at the Australian National University, Canberra. From 1982 to 1989, Körner was senior lecturer at the University of Innsbruck (1982: “Habilitation” for botany). In 1989, he became full professor of botany at the University of Basel. Since 2014, Körner is emeritus.

He is chair of the Alpine Research Station ALPFOR on the Furkapass, Switzerland. Together with Erika Hiltbrunner and others, he researches alpine plant life at the ALPFOR station.

Körner has a widely known talent in explaining complex and seemingly difficult subjects. This talent attracted broad interest outside the scientific community. This was especially the case when Körner was invited by His Majesty the King of Sweden in 2003 to participate in a private royal colloquium aimed at describing and discussing the problems of global environmental change for the biosphere.

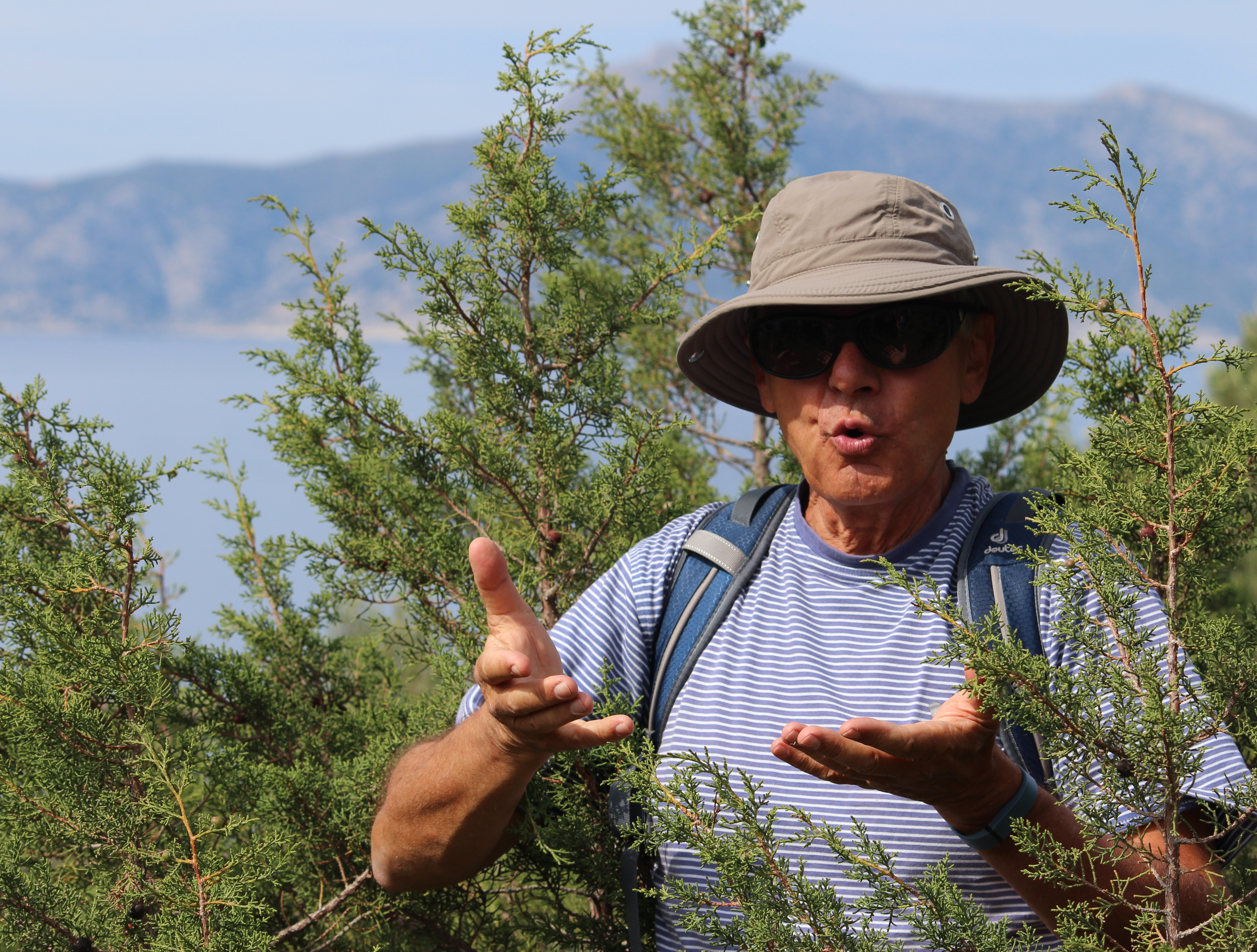
Christian Körner (Samos field trip 2014 – University of Basel)

Furthermore, Körner likes science mediation and comedy. Therefore, he attended the BES Science Slam 2015 in Edinburgh, performing 'What carbon cyclists can learn from bankers'.

== Research interests ==
- Alpine plant ecology and biodiversity
- High elevation treeline research
- Increasing CO_{2} concentration
- Climatic limits of European broad-leaved tree taxa
- Effects of elevated CO_{2} on photosynthesis and plant growth

== Academic achievements ==
- Highest score in Ecology for all German, Austrian and Swiss research institutions 1997-1998 (Bild der Wiss. 8/1999)
- Highest cited category of authors ISI (since 2000)
- Member of the Leopoldina (since 2000)
- Marsh Award, British Ecological Society (2007)
- King Albert Mountain Award by the King Albert I. Memorial Foundation for outstanding contribution to mountain research (2010)
- Co-author 'Strasburger' Botany textbook (founded 1894, 35-37th German, Ital, Span, Russ, Engl eds)
- Dr. h.c. (University of Innsbruck, Austria 2013)
- Dr. h.c. (Ilia State University, Tbilisi, Georgia 2014)

== Key publications ==
- Körner C., Asshoff R., Bignucolo O., Hättenschwiler S., Keel S.G. et al. (2005) Carbon flux and growth in mature deciduous forest trees exposed to elevated CO2. Science, Bd. 309, S. 1360–1362.
- Körner C. (2006) Plant CO2 responses: an issue of definition, time and resource supply. New Phytologist, Bd. 172, S. 393–411.
- Körner C. (2015) A paradigm shift in plant growth control. Curr Opin Plant Biol 25:107-114
- Körner C., Basler D., Hoch G., Kollas C., Lenz A., Randin C.F., Vitasse Y., Zimmermann N.E. (2016) Where, why and how? Explaining the low-temperature range limits of temperate tree species. J Ecol 104:1076-1088
- Klein T., Siegwolf R.T.W., Körner C. (2016) Belowground carbon trade among tall trees in a temperate forest. Science 352:342-344
- Körner C. (2017) A matter of tree longevity. Science 355:130-131

== Books ==
- Körner C. (2003) Alpine plant life. 2nd. Edition; Springer, Berlin
- Körner C. (2012) Alpine treelines. Springer, Berlin
- Körner C. (2013) Plant ecology (Chapt 11–14). In: Bresinsky et al. (eds) Strasburger's plant sciences. Springer, Berlin
