= St. Stephen's College, Delhi =

College of the University of Delhi, India

St. Stephen's College
- Crest of the St. Stephen's College, Delhi
- Motto: Latin: Ad Dei Gloriam
- Motto in English: To the Glory of God
- Established: 1 February 1881; 145 years ago
- Founder: Rev. Samuel Scott Allnutt
- Academic affiliations: University of Delhi; Church of North India
- Chairman: Revd. (Dr.) Paul Swarup
- Principal: Dr. Susan Elias
- Students: Around 500+ in each year
- Location: St Stephen's College, Sudhir Bose Marg, University Enclave, Delhi, 110007, India
- Campus: 25 acres (10 ha); Urban
- Colours: Martyr's red & Cambridge blue
- Website: ststephens.edu

St. Stephen's College is a constituent college of Delhi University. It awards both undergraduate and postgraduate degrees. Established in 1881, it is one of the oldest and most prestigious liberal arts and sciences colleges in India. The college has an acceptance rate of 1.33%.

== History ==
The history of St. Stephen's College can be traced to St. Stephen's High School, founded in 1854 by Samuel Scott Allnutt, chaplain of Delhi, run by the Delhi Mission of the United Society. With the closure of Government College, Delhi, in 1879 because of financial problems, Valpy French immediately urged the Cambridge Mission, an Anglican mission organised by the alumni of University of Cambridge, to fill the breach. The other major aim for the foundation of the college was response to British Indian Government's policy of promoting English education in India. It was Samuel Scott Allnutt of St. John's College, Cambridge, who was mainly responsible for founding the college. Finally on 1 February 1881, in support of the work of the United Society Partners in the Gospel, the Cambridge Brotherhood founded the St. Stephen's College. Allnutt served as its first principal.

The college's first premises were in Chandni Chowk, Delhi, with five boarders and three professors, and was an affiliate of the University of Calcutta, but later in 1882, it changed its affiliation to Punjab University. The Punjab University received its charter more than one year after the founding of St. Stephen's College, which became one of the two institutions first affiliated to it and moved into premises in Kashmiri Gate, Old Delhi in 1891.

In 1906, principal G. Hibbert Ware abdicated his post in favour of S. K. Rudra who became the first Indian to head a major educational institution in India. The decision was frowned upon at the time, but Rudra proved to have a tenure of extraordinary importance for the college.

Charles Freer Andrews, a prominent lecturer at the college and member of the Cambridge Brotherhood, was active in the Indian independence movement, and was named deenbandhu (friend of the poor) by Mahatma Gandhi on account of his work with the needy and the trade union movement. Currently, a portrait of Andrews is hung beside the portrait of his good friend Rabindranath Tagore in the principal's office. It is also believed that Rabindranath Tagore completed the English translation of Gitanjali, for which he was awarded the Nobel Prize in Literature, while a guest at the college.

With the establishment of the University of Delhi in 1922, the college became a constituent college of the university.

Women were first admitted in 1928, as there were no women's colleges in Delhi affiliated with the Anglican Church at the time; after the founding of Miranda House in 1949, women were not accepted as students until 1975.

St. Stephen's College shifted to its current location in the Delhi University Enclave in 1941. Prior to this, the college had been housed in the Kashmere Gate area.

Principal
- Samuel Scott Allnutt, 1881–1898
- John Wright, 1899–1902
- G. Hibbert Ware, 1902–1906
- Susil Kumar Rudra, 1906–1923
- Francis Fitzhugh Monk, 1923-1926
- Satya Nand Mukarji, 1926–1945
- Douglas Raja Ram, 1945–1960
- Satish Chandra Sircar, 1960–1972
- William Shaw Rajpal, 1972–1984
- John H. Hala, 1984–1991
- Anil Wilson, 1991–2007
- Valson Thampu, 2008–2016
- John Vargheese, 2016– 2026
- Susan Elias, 2026–present

=== Etymology ===
The college was named after Saint Stephen, who was adopted by the Anglican Church as the patron saint of Delhi after Christians were reportedly stoned to death during the 1857 uprising, as they were the first Christian martyrs in North India and were stoned, parallels to Saint Stephen were obvious.The red colour in the logo of the College represents the spirit of sacrifice as seen in the life of the Saint.

== Present form ==
St. Stephen's College is a co-educational institution of higher learning. It is one of the three founding colleges of University of Delhi, along with Hindu College and Ramjas College. In spite of its location in North India, the college has always striven to admit students and select teachers from all communities and from all parts of India. It also admits a small number of students from overseas. The college offers a number of scholarships and awards to meritorious students. These are endowed over a period of time. As of February 2017, the governing body of St. Stephen's College has decided to go ahead with the proposal to seek autonomy for the institution.

== Campus ==
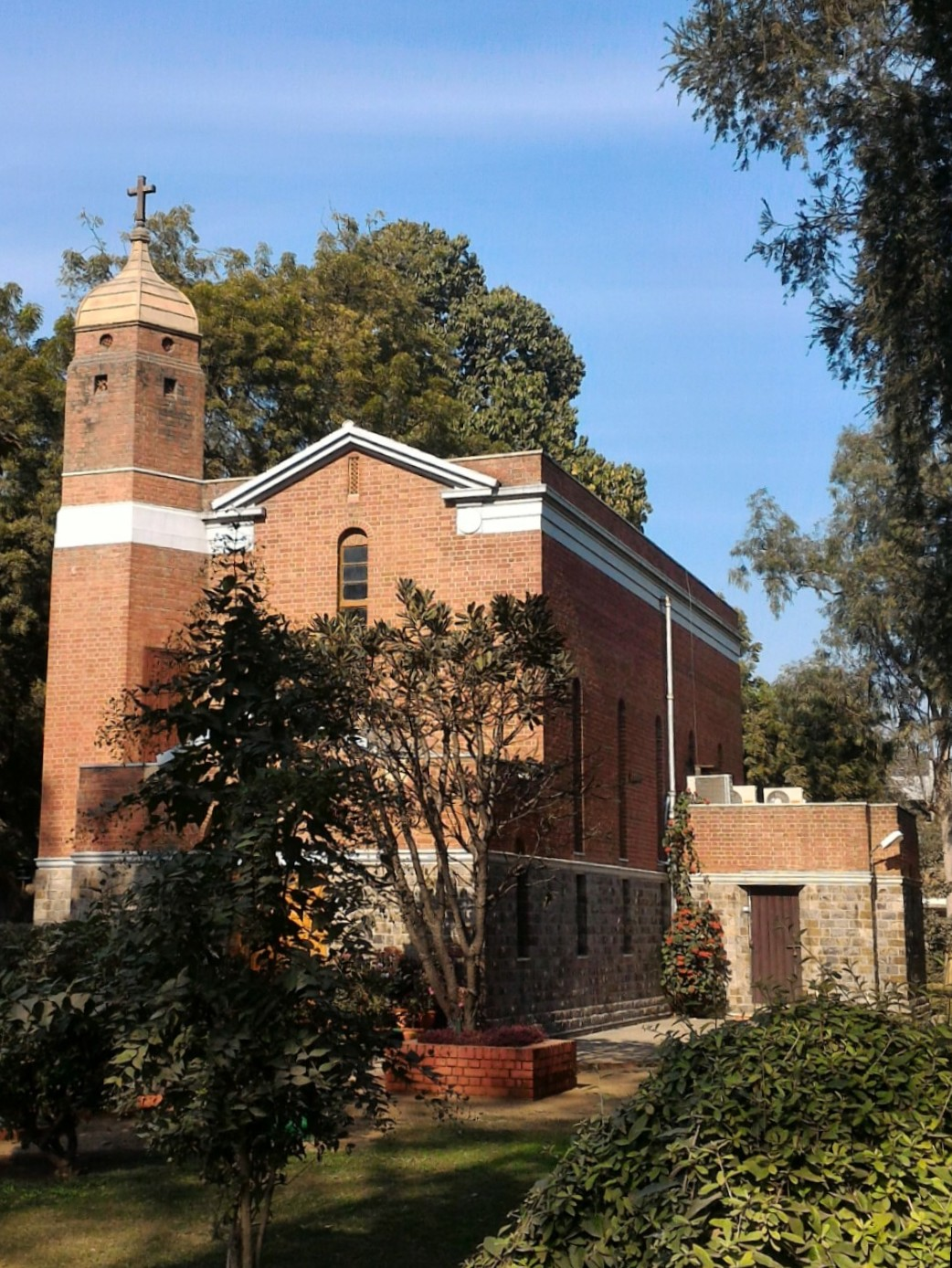
Church inside Saint Stephen's College

The campus is located in the North Campus of the University of Delhi and designed by the distinguished Welsh architect Walter Sykes George. The construction was completed in 1941. The college had previously functioned from a campus in Kashmiri Gate, Delhi, housed in distinctive Indo-Saracenic Revival architecture. This building now houses the Election Commission of Delhi.

In fact, some college playing fields are still located between Kashmiri Gate and Mori Gate localities. Facilities for a number of sports are provided for on the college campus. The Francis Monk Gymnasium, the Ladies Common Room, and the Junior Common Room provide facilities for indoor sports and recreation. A chapel is open to all members for worship and meditation.

=== Residence halls ===
There are different parts of the residence halls by means of the buildings having a main block and an extension. Originally only for male students (termed "Scholars in Residence"), three of these blocks are now allotted to female students. These blocks have a capacity of 500 men and women. Each block is supervised by a member of the faculty functioning as block tutor. Porters and other staff who work in residence are referred to as "gyps" and "karamcharis" respectively.

=== Library ===
The St. Stephen's College library has rare Sanskrit and Persian manuscripts. It also offers digital services to students and has its own homegrown online public access catalog. There is also a college archive housed in the library, containing various documents relating to the history of the college.

== Organisation and administration ==
The college has also introduced a one of a kind certificate course in "Citizenship and Cultural Richness" which brings together a series of lectures by eminent Indian academics in a variety of fields ranging from science to literature, economics and social values. This had been touted as outreach by the principal of the college.

== Academics ==
=== Rankings ===
College rankings

General – India
- NIRF (Colleges) (2024): 3

St. Stephen's was ranked third among colleges in India by the National Institutional Ranking Framework (NIRF) in 2024. India Today ranked St. Stephen second among art colleges and third among science colleges in 2020.

=== Admission ===
St Stephen's College is affiliated with Delhi University and accepts CUET score. As a minority college Stephen's has 50% minority reservation for Christians, and they are required to give an interview.

The cutoffs of St Stephen's College has always been one of the highest even before the introduction of CUET.

== Student life ==
=== Student societies ===
Student clubs and societies have always played an important role in the life of the college and are seen as vital to student development. Each academic subject has a society which sponsors lectures and discussions. The popular extra-curricular societies and clubs engage in activities concerned with debating, dramatics, wall climbing and trekking, film, social service, photography, quizzing and astronomy. The social service league of St. Stephen's College follows the mantra "Service above Self". It works for the betterment of the underprivileged sections of the society. In continuance of a long tradition, the Planning Forum regularly invites distinguished visitors to address and join issue with students on various topical issues.

== Notable alumni ==
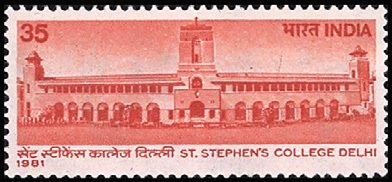
A commemorative postage stamp

Alumni and students of St. Stephen's College are called "Stephanians". Over the years, the college has produced distinguished alumni in fields like politics, administration, law, journalism, film and business. Its alumni network has been described as "the most powerful informal alliance of people in the country". Alumni of the college include distinguished economists, CEOs of Fortune 500 companies, scientists, mathematicians, historians, writers, bureaucrats, journalists, lawyers, politicians including several Members of Parliament (MP) in India, as well as the Heads of State of three countries, and sportspersons including a number of olympians and international athletes.
