= Wright Brothers Memorial Trophy =

American aviation award

- Wright Brothers Memorial Trophy
- Awarded for: "significant public service of enduring value to aviation in the United States".
- Country: United States of America
- Presented by: National Aeronautic Association
- First award: 1948
- Currently held by: Robert Crippen
- Website: Official website

The original trophy, awarded from 1948 to 2009

The Wright Brothers Memorial Trophy was established by the National Aeronautic Association (NAA) in 1948 after a trust fund was created in 1936 by Godfrey Lowell Cabot of Boston, a former president of the NAA. It is awarded to a living American for "significant public service of enduring value to aviation in the United States." The presentation of the award is made annually at the Aero Club of Washington, as close as possible to December 17 each year, the day on which, in 1903, the Wright brothers made the first flight in an airplane. The inaugural recipient of the trophy was William F. Durand, "a pioneer in aeronautics, naval propulsion and engineering research methods". Until 2010, winners of the award received a trophy depicting the Wright brothers' Wright Flyer aircraft. From 2010 onwards, a redesigned trophy featuring a silver obelisk and bronze inscription has been awarded.

The trophy has been awarded to women on four occasions: Olive Ann Beech, founding partner and president of Beech Aircraft, received the award in 1980; Marion Blakey, former administrator of the Federal Aviation Administration and chairman of the National Transportation Safety Board, was honored in 2013, Colleen Barrett, President Emeritus of Southwest Airlines, was the 2016 recipient, and retired NASA astronaut and USAF pilot Eileen Collins received the trophy in 2022.

== List of winners ==
Year	Image	Recipient	Notes	Ref(s)
1948	William Durand	William F. Durand	First civilian chairman of the National Advisory Committee for Aeronautics and prominent propeller designer	
1949	Charles Lindeburgh	Charles Lindbergh	First transatlantic flight (from New York to Paris) in the Spirit of St. Louis, cited for his "long and selfless career in aviation"	
1950	Grover Loening	Grover Loening	Pioneering aircraft designer who managed the Wright Company, co-founded Pan Am and Grumman	
1951	Jerome Clarke Hunsaker	Jerome Clarke Hunsaker	Aeronautical engineering pioneer who developed the first such course at the Massachusetts Institute of Technology, founder of the Institute of the Aeronautical Sciences	
1952	Jimmy Doolittle	Jimmy Doolittle	Decorated military aviator who led the first raid on Japan, pioneer in instrument flying and first president of the Air Force Association	
1953	John Carl Hinshaw	John Carl Hinshaw	Member of the United States House of Representatives, cited for "fostering the sound and consistent growth of aviation in all its forms, so that it might become a deterrent to war and that it might increasingly become an important carrier of the people and the commerce of the world."	
1954	Theodore von Kármán	Theodore von Kármán	Mathematician and physicist who pioneered theoretical aerodynamics	
1955	Hugh Latimer Dryden in October 1959	Hugh Latimer Dryden	Significant research into high-speed aerodynamics, fluid mechanics and acoustics, director of the National Advisory Committee for Aeronautics until the creation of NASA	
1956	Edward Pearson Warner	Edward Pearson Warner	Aeronautical engineer, first president of the International Civil Aviation Organization	
1957	Stuart Symington	Stuart Symington	First United States Secretary of the Air Force	
1958	–	John Frederick Victory	He "exerted a driving influence to advance the progress of aeronautics in America and to promote the public interest".	
1959	William P. MacCracken Jr. circa 1934	William P. MacCracken Jr.	"A pioneer in aviation legislation" and recognised as the first regulator of aviation in the United States	
1960	Frederick C. Crawford	Frederick C. Crawford	Industrialist and business leader who was the chairman of the National Advisory Committee for Aeronautics's Committee on Power Plants for Aircraft	
1961	Mike Monroney	Mike Monroney	Wrote and sponsored the Federal Aviation Act of 1958 that created the Federal Aviation Administration in pursuit of safer, more regulated aviation in the United States	
1962	John Stack in 1944	John Stack	Pioneered research into supersonic flight	
1963	Donald Wills Douglas Sr.	Donald Wills Douglas Sr.	President of the Douglas Aircraft Company from 1921 to 1957, which produced the Douglas DC-3, an aircraft recognised as bringing a "new era" of air travel	
1964	Harry Frank Guggenheim	Harry Frank Guggenheim	Established the Daniel Guggenheim Fund for the Promotion of Aeronautics with his father Daniel Guggenheim, establishing research centers across the United States	
1965	Jerome F. Lederer	Jerome F. Lederer	Pioneer in aircraft safety who led the introduction of the flight recorder to provide insight into air crashes	
1966	Juan Trippe	Juan Trippe	Founder of Pan American World Airways, cited for "public service of enduring value to aviation in the United States"	
1967	Igor Sikorsky	Igor Sikorsky	Aircraft pioneer whose work resulted in the design and production of the first mass-produced helicopter, the R-4	
1968	Warren Magnuson circa 1950s	Warren Magnuson	United States Senator whose "dynamic leadership in developing national and international policy that has assured United States' preeminence in aeronautics"	
1969	William McPherson Allen	William McPherson Allen	Businessman, member of the board at Boeing, cited for "significant public service in the development of commercial airlines, civil and military aircraft"	
1970	C. R. Smith	C. R. Smith	CEO of American Airlines from 1934 to 1968 and from 1973 to 1974, cited for his "significant public service of enduring value in development of military and civil air transportation and for his contributions as a dynamic leader and articulate spokesman for U.S. aviation progress."	
1971	Howard Cannon	Howard Cannon	United States Senator, cited for "use of aviation, both as a viable national transportation system and as an essential element in maintaining a strong military posture", played a "role in passing legislation that deregulated the airline and trucking industries"	
1972	John H. Shaffer	John H. Shaffer	Administrator of the Federal Aviation Administration from 1969 to 1973 "to the benefit and safety of the general public and of all who fly".	
1973	Barry Goldwater in September 1962	Barry Goldwater	Helped secure the Goldwater–Nichols Act and cited as "serving as an articulate spokesman for American aviation and space in the Congress and throughout the world"	
1974	Richard T. Whitcomb in April 1955	Richard T. Whitcomb	Pioneering aerodynamicist who conceived of the supercritical airfoil concept	
1975	Kelly Johnson circa 1975	Kelly Johnson	Aeronautical engineer who, with the Skunk Works, was responsible for the design of many pioneering aircraft including the Lockheed U-2 and SR-71 Blackbird	
1976	–	William A. Patterson	President of United Airlines from 1934 until 1966, cited for "his contributions to the development of safe and efficient air transportation"	
1977	Ira C. Eaker	Ira C. Eaker	Commander of the United States Army Air Forces in Europe in World War II, helped establish the United States Air Force as a separate entity	
1978	Jennings Randolph	Jennings Randolph	Cited for his "successful initiation and advocacy of major aviation legislation over more than three decades of service in Congress"	
1979	–	Thornton Wilson	Headed the development of the LGM-30 Minuteman intercontinental ballistic missile, president of Boeing	
1980	Olive Ann Beech	Olive Ann Beech	Co-founder, president, and chairwoman of the Beech Aircraft Company	
1981	–	Dwane Wallace	President and/or chairman of the board of the Cessna Aircraft Company from 1935 until the 1970s	
1982	Willis Hawkins	Willis Hawkins	Designer of the Lockheed C-130 Hercules, cited for "more than 40 years of public service to aviation through technical innovations and management leadership in the design, development, and production of military and commercial aircraft, space vehicles, and advanced missilery"	
1983	John Leland Atwood	John Leland Atwood	Chief Engineer/Executive at North American Aviation for more than 35 years, involved in the design of multiple aircraft including the P-51 Mustang, X-15 and the Apollo Lunar Module	
1984	David S. Lewis in 1983	David S. Lewis	Aeronautical engineer who was chairman and CEO of General Dynamics, during which time the company produced the F-16, and the Trident submarine and the M1 Abrams tank	
1985	–	Harry B. Combs	Cited for "over half a century of significant and enduring contributions to aviation as a pilot, an industrial leader, an author, and an advisor to government", including creating Combs Aircraft, a company which trained thousands of military pilots during World War II	
1986	Joe Sutter in July 2006	Joe Sutter	Aeronautical engineer who managed the Boeing design team developing the Boeing 747 and who "contributed significantly to U.S. preeminence in civil aeronautics"	
1987	–	Allen Paulson	Businessman, head of Gulfstream and pilot who set various speed records, cited for his "outstanding and enduring contributions to aviation as a pilot, designer, entrepreneur, industry leader, and employer throughout a career spanning over 40 years"	
1988	–	Sam B. Williams	Pioneered advances in small gas-turbine-engine technologies	
1989	–	Thomas V. Jones	Chairman and chief executive officer of Northrop Corporation, cited for "guiding the development of advanced aircraft, electronic systems, and manufacturing technologies"	
1990	–	Edwin I. Colodny	Chairman of the USAir Group, cited for "a lifetime of meritorious service to air transportation as an airline executive and public servant"	
1991	–	Benjamin A. Cosgrove	Contributed to the design of "four generations" of Boeing aircraft, cited for "a lifetime contribution to commercial aviation safety"	
1992	Jake Garn	Jake Garn	Senator, payload specialist on board STS-51-D and cited as "one of the U.S. Senate's most effective aerospace spokesmen and legislators"	
1993	–	Gerhard Neumann	German-born American engineer, cited for "extraordinary achievement, creative effort, and inspired leadership in the design and development of aircraft engines", including designing the world's first nuclear-powered jet engine	
1994	–	Albert Lee Ueltschi	Founder of FlightSafety International Inc.	
1995	–	Russell W. Meyer Jr.	Chairman and chief executive officer of Cessna from 1975, cited for the "advancement of worldwide aviation safety through sophisticated training methods, and use of aviation to deliver state-of-the-art health care to people otherwise deprived of such high quality medical service"	
1996	Frederick W. Smith	Frederick W. Smith	Founder, chairman, president, and CEO of FedEx, created in 1971, cited in part for "leadership in the revitalization of general aviation"	
1997	–	Charles Kaman	Pioneer in the development and manufacture of helicopter technology	
1998	–	Edward Stimpson	Dedicated his career to aviation safety, cited in part for his "active involvement in creating career opportunities for young men and women"	
1999		Delford M. Smith	Founder of Evergreen Helicopters, cited in part for his "exceptional achievements in creation of worldwide aviation enterprises"	
2000	Herb Kelleher in October 2007	Herb Kelleher	Chairman Emeritus and former CEO of Southwest Airlines which demonstrated a "revolutionary and successful model for low fares, innovative customer service and employee recognition"	
2001	Neil Armstrong in July 1969	Neil Armstrong	Cited for "a lifetime of public service as a Navy pilot, a civilian test pilot, a NASA Astronaut commanding Gemini 8 and Apollo 11, the first person to step on the Moon, an engineer, an educator and a business leader"	
2002	Poberezny in 1977	Paul Poberezny	Founder of the Experimental Aircraft Association, cited in part for "devoting his life to making aviation accessible to all Americans"	
2003	John Glenn	John Glenn	Cited for "his service as a military pilot, NASA astronaut and U.S. Senator from Ohio. Glenn led the United States' efforts in exploring outer space, becoming the first American to orbit the Earth"	
2004	Robert Crandall	Robert Crandall	Former president and chairman of American Airlines, cited as "a pioneer following government deregulation of the airlines, and he defined and shaped the industry as it exists today"	
2005	Edward C. Aldridge in May 2001	Edward C. Aldridge Jr.	The 16th United States Secretary of the Air Force	
2006	Norman Mineta circa 2001	Norman Mineta	The 14th and longest serving United States Secretary of Transportation, cited in part for "a myriad of lasting accomplishments to the world of transportation and aviation"	
2007	Eugene Cernan in December 1971	Eugene Cernan	Last man to walk on the Moon, cited for "his extraordinary lifetime of achievement as an Astronaut, Naval Aviator, and Ambassador for Aerospace"	
2008	Norman R. Augustine in July 2009	Norman R. Augustine	Chairman of the Review of United States Human Space Flight Plans Committee, cited for his "legendary and inspirational aerospace leadership in both industry and government"	
2009	–	Steven F. Udvar-Házy	Former chairman and CEO of International Lease Finance Corporation, cited for his "innovative aerospace business practices, improved aircraft design, piloting skills, and selfless philanthropy ensuring preservation of our aerospace history"	
2010	Harrison Ford in 2017	Harrison Ford	Actor and pilot, cited for "engaging our nation's youth in aviation and inspiring tomorrow's leaders, innovators and enthusiasts to secure a strong future for all of aviation"	
2011	Thomas P. Stafford in April 1972	Thomas P. Stafford	Commander of Apollo 10, cited for "pioneering achievements that have led the way to the moon, to greater international cooperation in space, and to a safer America"	
2012	–	Robert J. Stevens	Former chairman, president and CEO of Lockheed Martin, cited for "his dedication, leadership, and major contributions to the security of the United States"	
2013	Marion Blakey	Marion Blakey	President and CEO of the Aerospace Industries Association, administrator of the Federal Aviation Administration, cited in part for her "distinguished career as a dedicated public servant"	
2014	Bob Hoover in July 2011	Bob Hoover	Considered one of the "great pilots in history", cited in part for "providing an unsurpassed, inspiring example to generations of pilots worldwide"	
2015	Burt Rutan in October 2004	Burt Rutan	Aerospace engineer who designed Voyager, SpaceShipOne, and multiple pioneering homebuilt aircraft	
2016	Colleen Barrettin October 2007	Colleen Barrett	Cited for "dedicating nearly 50 years to aviation, including serving as President of Southwest Airlines, where she devoted herself to creating a unique, service-oriented corporate culture which made her one of the most successful leaders in U.S. airline history"	
2017	John R. Dailey	John R. Dailey	Cited for "his courageous and dedicated service to the country and his commitment to sharing the history and technology of aviation and space flight with present and future generations"	
2018	Lloyd W. "Fig" Newton	Lloyd W. Newton	Flew 269 combat missions in Vietnam and, in 1974, he joined the renowned U.S. Air Force Demonstration Team, "The Thunderbirds”, as the first African American pilot. Newton served as Commander, Air Education and Training Command from 1997 to 2000. He retired in 2000 from the United States Air Force as a four-star general.	
2019	Michael Collins	Michael Collins	Cited for "his lifelong dedication to aerospace and public service in the highest order, both as a pioneering astronaut and inspired director of the Smithsonian’s National Air and Space Museum."	
2020	Charles Bolden	Charles Bolden	"For his impassioned commitment to public service in aviation and aerospace as an aviator, astronaut, and leader and his dedication to excellence for the advancement of all humanity."	
2022	Eileen Collins	Eileen Collins	"For her perseverance in the advancement of aviation and aerospace as a teacher, astronaut, and leader, and for serving as an inspiration for all those seeking to break barriers in their field."	
2023	Robert Crippen	Robert Crippen	"For his devotion to public service and the advancement of American aerospace; his achievements as an aviator, astronaut, and leader; and his selfless dedication to the future of humankind."	
2024	-	Ben Baldanza	"For his 38 years of dedicated service to the U.S. airline industry and his visionary leadership in introducing the ultra-low-cost model to the United States, which has expanded access to air travel to tens-of-millions of Americans."	
2025	-	Joan Sullivan Garrett	"For visionary leadership and dedication that have enhanced aviation safety for over four decades, permanently raising industry standards and saving countless lives."	

== See also ==
- List of aviation awards
- Wright Brothers Medal
