= Russell W. Meyer Jr. =

American aviation executive (1932–2026)

Russell W. Meyer Jr. (July 19, 1932 – March 4, 2026) was an American aviation executive who, after transforming American Aviation Corporation into Grumman American, became the chairman and chief executive officer (CEO) of the Cessna Aircraft Company, leading it for three decades. Meyer eventually rose to president of the parent company, Textron's, Aviation Sector (including Bell Helicopter and Lycoming Engines). His work included expanding the Grumman American line of light aircraft, radically expanding the Cessna Citation line of business jets to the world's largest and fastest, and salvaging Bell Helicopter's floundering V-22 Osprey program.

Meyer chaired the General Aviation Manufacturers Association (GAMA) for three terms, and served on various Presidential national aviation commissions. He was a key driving force in the passage of the federal General Aviation Revitalization Act (GARA), which limited aircraft manufacturers' liability, shielding a dying lightplane industry.

Meyer was a noted innovator in corporate and executive philanthropy, particularly noted for creating the Citation Special Olympics Airlift, reportedly the nation's largest peacetime recurring airlift, to transport thousands of disabled athletes to the Special Olympics. He, his wife, and his company created hometown facilities to aid struggling workers and the poor, which drew attention and involvement of U.S. presidents from both parties.

Meyer was awarded the Wright Brothers Memorial Trophy, and the Collier Trophy on two separate occasions (once jointly with Cessna), and the Meritorious Service Award from the National Business Aircraft Association (NBAA), and top awards from other national aviation organizations, the U.S. Chamber of Commerce and various other organizations, media and institutions. In 2009, he was enshrined in the National Aviation Hall of Fame.

== Life and career ==
=== Early life and education ===
Meyer was born in Davenport, Iowa, on July 19, 1932. He graduated from Yale University with a B.A. degree in 1954, and was awarded a Doctor of Law degree from Harvard Law School in 1961.

=== Jet pilot and attorney ===
Meyer was a jet pilot in the U.S. Air Force from 1955 to 1958 and served with the Marine Corps Reserves from 1958 to 1961.

Between 1961 and 1966, Meyer was an attorney with Arter & Hadden in Cleveland, Ohio.

Over the course of his career, from his military service to the end of his aviation executive career, he acquired a commercial pilot certificate with instrument and multi-engine ratings, and accumulated more than 50 aircraft type ratings, logging over 17,000 hours of flight time, in aircraft ranging from tiny single-engine propeller aircraft to military fighter jets, and the world's fastest civilian jet (his own company's Citation X).

Meyer co-founded the Be A Pilot program with AOPA to reverse a decades-long decline in new pilots.

=== Aviation CEO ===
==== American Aviation and Grumman American ====
Because of Meyer's experience in aviation, he was hired to structure financing for the American Aviation Corporation, developing their small, two-seat American AA-1 Yankee airplane, quickly rising to the company's general counsel, then President and CEO, from 1966 to 1974, as the company became known for exceptional, competitive innovations in light aircraft, becoming one of the nation's leading producers of light aircraft. In 1972, Meyer presided over American Aviation's transitional merger with the Gulfstream division of Grumman Aircraft, to create Grumman American Aviation Corporation, building not only the small 2-4 seat American Aviation single-engine light planes, and a light twin, but also the industry's largest, fastest, pure business jet: the Gulfstream series, and its most primitive: the Grumman AgCat cropduster biplane. Meyer continued in that role, until 1974.

==== Cessna Aircraft and Textron ====
In 1974, Meyer was recruited by long-time Cessna President and Chairman Dwane Wallace to become one of two Executive Vice Presidents of Cessna Aircraft Company—by then the world's largest general aviation aircraft manufacturer—with the implied opportunity to rise to CEO when aging Wallace retired. Meyer was elected the company's CEO in 1975 by Wallace and the rest of the Board of Directors, and would serve in that role from 1975 to 2000, and again from June 2002 to 2004, succeeded by Jack J. Pelton. In 1978, he was also elevated to chairman of the Board of Cessna.

In 1985, as the general aviation industry collapsed in the early-1980s recession, and Cessna's competitors merged with larger companies for survival, Meyer presided over Cessna's sale to major shareholder General Dynamics.

In 1986, Meyer and Cessna were awarded the Collier Trophy, the nation's highest aviation industry honor, for the worldwide safety record of the Cessna Citation fleet of business jets. Ten years later, in 1996, under his leadership, the Collier Trophy was again awarded to Cessna for developing the Citation X, the first commercial aircraft to achieve a cruising speed of Mach .92, making it the fastest business jet in the world.

He also helped lead the passage of the 1994 General Aviation Revitalization Act, and was involved in various programs throughout his career that aimed at growing and strengthening the aviation industry.

In 1992, Meyer presided over Cessna when it changed hands from General Dynamics to Textron. In 1999, Meyer retired as Cessna CEO, handing the job to Cessna veteran Gary Hay, though initially retaining the title of chairman.

However, when Textron's troubled Bell Helicopter, burdened by the fumbling V-22 Osprey program, began to weigh on Textron, and Meyer's successor at Cessna resigned, Meyer was called back from semi-retirement January 7, 2002, to take over as president all of Textron's "Aviation Sector" enterprises, including Bell Helicopter, Cessna, and Lycoming Engines. succeeding in turning the division around. When Cessna Chairman and CEO Gary Hay unexpectedly retired in June 2002, Meyer resumed the role, before handing the Cessna CEO title to Charlie Johnson, then Jack Pelton in 2003—retiring, again, in early 2005, as Cessna's "Chairman Emeritus."

==== Industry organizations ====
Meyer served three terms as Chairman of the General Aviation Manufacturers Association (GAMA), and served on two Presidential aviation commissions. He served on two presidential commissions: the National Commission to Ensure a Strong Competitive Airline Industry, and the 1987 Aviation Safety Commission.

=== Philanthropy ===
Meyer conceived the Citation Special Olympics Airlift in 1986, which uses Cessna Citation Jets to transport thousands of disabled athletes to the National Special Olympics, one of the largest peacetime airlifts in the nation's history. For decades, the quadrennial project gathered volunteer pilots and owners of Cessna Citation business jets to provide disabled athletes with free transport, in Cessna jets, to-and-from the national event.

In Cessna's hometown, Wichita, Meyer spearheaded Cessna's development of an inner-city training center for struggling workers, Cessna's 21st Street Training Program; and in 1997 President Bill Clinton visited Wichita to commemorate the project. Meyer, With his wife Helen, also led development of a new 42,000-square-foot complex for the local Boys and Girls Club of South Central Kansas to provide safe, free entertainment and education for inner-city youth; and in 2007, President George W. Bush visited Wichita to dedicate it. Meyer oversaw integration of the two enterprises—along with child care and housing resources for the needy involved. The couple were also driving force in development of the city's GraceMed charity clinics.

=== Personal life and death ===
Meyer was a close and longtime friend of golfer, pilot, Cessna owner and aircraft promoter Arnold Palmer.

He and his wife Helen had five children. Meyer died in Wichita on March 4, 2026, at the age of 93.

== Awards and honors ==
- 1986: Robert J. Collier Trophy, National Aeronautic Association (NAA); U.S. aviation's highest award for achievement in aviation, awarded to Meyer and Cessna for the Cessna Citation line of business jets and their exceptional safety record.
- 1995: Wright Brothers Memorial Trophy, National Aeronautic Association (NAA), officially for "`leadership in the revitalization of general aviation, effective public service, and innovative aviation-related programs and [other service]"—largely for spearheading the General Aviation Revitalization Act, and restoring Cessna lightplane production, and for the Special Olympics Airlift.
- 1995: Meritorious Service to Aviation Award, National Business Aviation Association (NBAA), the Association's highest honor
- 1996: (to Cessna, under Meyer's leadership): Collier Trophy, NAA, second award, for the Citation X
- 1996: Enshrinee, Kansas Aviation Hall of Fame
- 2004: William A. Ong Award, top award of the National Air Transportation Association (NATA)
- 2009: Enshrinee, National Aviation Hall of Fame
- 2012: Carol B. Hallett Award, U.S. Chamber of Commerce, for his "critical leadership role at the intersection of aviation, business, policy and philanthropy"
- 2014: Wichita Aero Club Trophy, for contributions to the aviation industry and to the local community
- 2016: "Russ Meyer Award for Community Leadership" named for Meyer, Newman University
- 2023: (to Russ and Helen Meyer): the 2023 Corporate Citizenship Outstanding Philanthropists, Wichita chapter of the Association of Fundraising Professionals
- 2024: R.A. “Bob” Hoover Award, Aircraft Owners and Pilots Association (AOPA), in recognition of his commitment to aviation.
- 2025: Grand Laureate for Business Aviation, Aviation Week
