= Dwane Wallace =

American aviation businessman (1911–1989)

- Born: Dwane Leon Wallace; October 29, 1911; Belmont, Kansas, U.S.
- Died: December 21, 1989 (aged 78); Wichita, Kansas, U.S.
- Education: Wichita State University (BS)
- Occupations: Aviation businessman, aircraft designer
- Known for: Longtime president of Cessna Aircraft
- Spouse: Velma Lunt (m. 1941)
- Children: 4
- Relatives: Clyde Cessna (uncle)

Dwane Leon Wallace (October 29, 1911 – December 21, 1989) was an American aviation businessman and aircraft designer. He served as the president and chairman of the board of the Cessna Aircraft Company from 1935 until the 1970s, continuing then on the board as a director and consultant into the 1980s. Later known as the "Quiet Giant of Aviation", Wallace oversaw the company during a period of rapid and expansive growth within the general aviation industry, including development of the most-produced aircraft in history, the Cessna 172, as well as the popular Cessna Citation I business jet. He was posthumously inducted into the National Aviation Hall of Fame in 2012, and was included in Flying Magazine's list of the "51 Heroes of Aviation" in 2013, placing at number 11.

== Early life ==
Dwane Wallace was raised in Belmont, Kansas. He and his brothers Deane and Dwight, and sister Doreen, were children of Grace Opal (née Cessna) and physician Dr. Eugene Wallace. Grace's brother was aviation pioneer Clyde Vernon Cessna, founder of Cessna Aircraft Company. Cessna became the first planemaker-aviator of the Great Plains in the year Dwane was born, and gave the brothers their first airplane ride in an OX-5 Swallow in 1924.

One account describes Wallace as having made up his mind at age 10 to make his life in aviation.

In his early adulthood, Wallace entered the aeronautical engineering program at the Municipal University of Wichita, in Wichita, Kansas (one of the nation's first three such programs), and graduated in May/June 1933 (historian Ed Phillips says June 1932), the first (of many) to graduate that university with a bachelor's degree in aeronautical engineering.

While at Wichita U., Wallace learned to fly from his uncle's test pilot, George Harte. He soloed in the Cessna CG-2 after only an hour and 45 minutes training, and advised changes to the glider that resulted in the Cessna CG-3. He first soloed in Travel Air biplane in March 1932, earning his private pilot's license in 1933. (Later he would advance to a commercial pilot license, with multi-engine and instrument-flight ratings.)

== Early career ==
Upon his graduation, in May 1933, Wallace entered the workforce during the depths of the Great Depression. His uncle Clyde Cessna's enterprise had been taken over by its investors, and had closed its doors—ejecting Clyde and his son, Eldon Cessna.

However, Wallace was able to find work assisting one of his uncle's former business partners, aviation pioneer Walter Beech, at the newly formed Beech Aircraft Corporation in Wichita—which, ironically, was operating from rented space in the closed Cessna factory. Wallace assisted the development of the Beech Model 17 "Staggerwing" biplane, one of the more advanced aircraft of its time.

== Takeover of Cessna Aircraft Co. ==
In 1934, following Beech's relocation out of the Cessna factory, Dwane, with lawyer-brother Dwight, approached their uncle Clyde with the idea of a proxy fight to try to regain control of Cessna Aircraft, reopen the factory, and resume aircraft development and production.

Traveling the country to meet and persuade investors, and committing to them that the three family leaders would work with little or no pay, the Wallace brothers won the proxy fight. At a stockholders' meeting on January 10, 1934, they seized control of the company, with Clyde serving as figurehead president, while the Wallace brothers (Dwane as plant manager and engineer, Dwight as secretary-treasurer) ran the company.

Clyde's son, Eldon (also an aeronautical engineer), remained at the company until a disagreement with Wallace over salary led to his departure in summer 1935. In December 1935, tired of aviation and longing for his old farm, Clyde sold his stock in the company to the Wallace brothers, though remained the figurehead president. Within about a year, in October 1936, shortly before Wallace's 25th birthday, Clyde resigned, leaving Wallace fully in charge.

== Cessna career ==
For the next four decades, Wallace would lead Cessna, transforming it from a small-but-noted maker of light planes into the world's foremost producer of such aircraft, and a major source of many other types of civilian and military aircraft, including jets.

Throughout his career, Wallace was described as totally focused on the company. According to successor Russ Meyer, Wallace did not play golf or tennis, and had "absolutely no avocation [except] Cessna." Despite his achievements, and the scope of his wealth, power and influence, Wallace had a reputation for shyness and humility, and was known to humbly mingle and dine with factory workers. In his early years as company president, he also test-flew, raced and sold planes, painted them, pitched for the lunchtime softball team, fetched water for factory workers, and swept floors.

Shyness notwithstanding, according to his long-time second-in-command, Del Roskam, Wallace was a "hands-on" manager, "a good people-person," who would tour the factory, meeting foremen and workers, and talking through problems with them personally.

=== The Great Depression years ===
Starting in 1933, Wallace aided Clyde and Eldon Cessna in developing their CR-3 aircraft, a much-improved variant on the Cessna Model A series, and also produced older Cessna DC-6A cabin monoplanes.

In 1934, Wallace, with help from Eldon and others, designed the Cessna C-34 (for "Cessna – 1934"), an exceptionally low-drag airplane, offering 162-mph speed with a 145-horsepower engine, and delivered the first one to a customer in 1935. The plane (and its variants) introduced wing flaps to Cessna, allowing a lower-drag wing, and easier landing in small areas. The plane won numerous races and competitions. When Wallace won a major national efficiency-and-performance competition—the Detroit News Trophy at the All American Air Races—for the third year, in a C-34 variant, the Cessna Aircraft design was awarded the trophy permanently, and given the title "World's Most Efficient Airplane." The notoriety boosted sales, and in 1936, the company sold 33 of the planes.

NOTE: Some controversy exists among historical accounts of the development of the C-34. Eldon Cessna, and historians acquainted with him, have credited its design to Eldon. However, most historical accounts (mostly produced by Cessna personnel or authors aided by the company while under the control of Dwane Wallace), credit the design to Wallace – some saying it originated in Wallace's mind while still in college, though Eldon Cessna is commonly credited with having been a contributing engineer, along with engineers Tom Salter and Gerry Gerteis.

In addition to advancing the Cessna airplanes' reputation, and sales, exhibition flying at county fairs and major events, and trophy racing, also brought prize money, which helped keep the company solvent—making exhibition flying and racing necessary duties of Wallace's early Cessna career.

The early years, during the Great Depression—while he took no salary—were reportedly extremely difficult for the company and Wallace, and photos of him at the time show an extremely gaunt man. One enduring legend says that at one point he only had five dollars in the company bank account.

Wallace added aircraft maintenance services to the company's business activity by February 1935.

In 1937, Wallace hired an executive secretary, Velma Lunt, in 1937, and married her in 1941. She became a licensed pilot, certified to fly multi-engine aircraft, and worked closely with Wallace for many years. The two remained married until Wallace's death. (Eventually the couple had four daughters: Linda, Karen, Diana and Sarah; the New York Times obituary calls the latter "Farah".)

In 1938, Wallace's review of twin-engined airplane market indicated opportunity for a new, inexpensive, light twin, and he began development of the Cessna T-50 Bobcat, which introduced twin engines and retractable landing gear to Cessna production aircraft. Though not formally trained in twin-engine aircraft, and not licensed for their operation, he taught himself to fly the Bobcat in 1939, as its test pilot. Gambling on a good market for the civilian plane, and potential military market for it upon the eruption of World War II in Europe, Wallace invested heavily in a new factory in May 1940. The gamble paid off.

=== World War II ===
Under Wallace, the Cessna Aircraft Company survived until the early years of World War II, before American involvement, when Wallace was able to secure contracts with the U.S. and Canadian government to build training plane variants of the Bobcat for the Royal Canadian Air Force (which was already aiding Great Britain in the war), and, as the Cessna AT-8 advanced trainer, it was acquired by the thousands by the U.S. Army Air Corps, to train most U.S. transport and bomber pilots for the war, and for use as a light transport. By war's end, over 5,000 had been delivered, making Cessna, undeniably, one of the nation's major plane-makers, though only with small planes.

Additional wartime contracts—making parts of other manufacturers' military planes, and assembling Waco CG-4A combat transport gliders—helped Wallace's company grow. The government funding supporting Cessna's manufacture of sections of advanced all-metal aircraft, such as engine cowls for the Douglas A-26 and tails for the Boeing B-29, enabled Cessna to leap ahead of other pre-war light plane makers (most of whom were largely relegated to producing their original frame-and-fabric aircraft, or similar planes, soon made obsolete by the technological leaps of the Second World War).

During the war, Cessna became the first of Wichita's planemakers to win the Army-Navy "E" Award, an award for excellence given to only 3% of U.S. defense contractors. Cessna would win it a total of five times.

=== Postwar years ===
Cessna re-entered the civilian plane market after World War II with a key advantage over most of its light-plane rivals: Cessna had the know-how and means to build all-metal light planes—an advantage accruing to Cessna from the company's rights to key metal-plane manufacturing technologies pioneered and patented by former Cessna Vice President Albin K. Longren, and Cessna's government-funded, wartime subcontracting work with large metal airplane sections.

After the war, Wallace quickly developed an all-metal replacement of the C-34—the Cessna 190 / Cessna 195, a speedy 6-seat, single-engine, executive aircraft, powered by a large, traditional radial engine.

Wallace then guided Cessna away from the pioneering un-braced cantilever-wing design concepts of Clyde Cessna, towards more conservative-and-traditional, strut-braced, high wings—producing the world's most successful line of single-engine light aircraft, ranging through numerous variants from the Cessna 120/Cessna 140 to the Cessna 207—despite the industry's move towards cantilever wings. The 120/140 also was the beginning of Cessna's conversion to smaller-cabin aircraft with streamlined, flat, horizontal-cylinder engines.

The 120/140's distinguishing feature, compared to other two-seaters of the time, was that it was one of the first all-metal light planes. Sleek, sturdy and modern, and cheaply mass-produced, the 120/140 largely devoured the market for two-seat light airplanes. In December 1946, Cessna produced almost as many planes as all its competitors combined. Most other U.S. light plane makers, by the early 1950s, were driven out of business by the 120/140 design, and by a long, postwar market recession. Cessna survived and prospered—stretching the 120/140 into the 4-seat Cessna 170 (which conquered its market segment, as well).

When the postwar recession of the late 1940s and early 1950s wiped out most general aviation planemakers, Wallace diversified and survived adding an industrial division producing furniture and hydraulic equipment at a factory in Hutchinson, Kansas, He expanded the company's dealer network globally, and added a customer-finance division to the company, boosting sales substantially.

Wallace, however, was slow to embrace the industry's shift towards nosewheel-equipped aircraft, replacing tailwheel-equipped planes, allowing rival Piper to recapture much of the light plane market with its Tri-Pacer for several years. Eventually, Wallace responded with a nosewheel-equipped variant of the 170, the Cessna 172, which would eventually become the world's most popular light airplane (still in production as of 2016). By 1958, Cessna was producing more light aircraft than all four of its main competitors combined, eventually controlling over half the market.

Starting in the late 1950s, Wallace added light twins to the Cessna line, and began the diversification of the Cessna line into almost every conceivable type and market.

Wallace sought military subcontracting work, resulting in Cessna building major sections of various U.S. jet trainers, fighters and bombers, including the Lockheed T-33, Lockheed F-94, Republic F-84, Boeing B-47 and Boeing B-52. That work complimented Cessna's development of the Cessna T-37, selected by the U. S. Air Force as its basic jet trainer for several decades.

In the late 1950s and early 1960s, Wallace decided to diversify Cessna, acquiring avionics-producer Aircraft Radio Corporation and propeller-maker McCauley Industrial Corporation. He expanded Cessna's Fluid Power Division (producing hydraulic cylinders for a wide range of industrial uses) in Hutchinson, Kansas, and opened Cessna parts or aircraft factories in Glenrothes, Scotland, Reims, France, and later in Mendoza, Argentina—along with marketing and servicing centers at other places around the world.

In 1964, to honor Cessna's international trade development, U.S. President Lyndon Johnson, at a White House ceremony, presented Wallace with the Presidential "E" for Export Award.

Along the way, under Wallace's guidance, Cessna produced "an airplane for every need"—almost every conceivable type of light-to-medium, single-engine and multi-engine aircraft—including: gliders, bush planes, small military transports, floatplanes, aerobatic stunt planes, helicopters, executive aircraft, cropdusters, small airliners, military spotter and liaison aircraft, military trainers (propeller and jet), attack jets, and business jets—over 40 models in all.

The four-engined Cessna 620 airliner and the Cessna Skyhook helicopter line were scrapped before any significant production, as was the four-seat, civilian version of the otherwise-successful Cessna T-37 military jet trainer. However, many Cessna aircraft types developed under Wallace became the most popular of their kind in the world, including the world's most produced aircraft of all time, the Cessna 172/Skyhawk, as well as the Cessna 150 (fifth most-produced aircraft), the Cessna 182 (sixth most-produced), as well as the Cessna 185/Skywagon 185, and the cropduster Cessna 188/AgWagon.

Wallace was president of Cessna Aircraft from 1935 to 1964, then advanced to chairman of the board. The company that he had revived from the brink of bankruptcy, in 1935, had become, by 1972, the first company in world history to manufacture over 100,000 airplanes.

In 1972, Wallace led the industry movement to establish a trade organization for general aviation aircraft manufacturers, separate from the industry trade organizations for manufacturers of commercial and military aircraft. The new organization, the General Aviation Manufacturers Association, selected founder Wallace as its first chairperson.

One of the Wallace's later projects was the development of Cessna's first business jet, initially announced in 1968 as the Cessna FanJet 500, soon renamed Cessna Citation. Wallace supported the concept of a relatively economical business jet that was designed to be more easy to operate and capable of using shorter runways that many contemporary jets. Its comparatively low speed attracted some criticism and became the subject of jokes within the aviation industry, but Cessna positioned it as an alternative to Lear Jet, whose Model 23 was faster and more expensive. The Citation 500 was certified in 1971 and entered the service the following year. The design became the basis of Cessna Citation and became one of the most widely produced business jets in the world.

By the end of his tenure in office, Wallace's Cessna Aircraft Co. had out-produced every other civilian airplane maker in world history, with over 170,000 aircraft produced—ranging from fabric-skinned, taildraggers and two-seat training planes, to combat aircraft and business jets.

=== Retirement ===
In 1974, Wallace recruited aviation industry executive Russell W. Meyer Jr. from his role as president and CEO of rival Grumman American Aircraft Corp., and groomed Meyer to replace himself. Wallace then retired, in 1975, from the role of Cessna's chairman of the board—handing over the company to Meyer, and stepping down to become a regular member of the board of directors.

Wallace quickly disappeared from the public eye, except for philanthropic activity (particularly in Wichita and for his alma mater, Wichita State University) with his wife Velma. However, he remained a consultant and director of the company well into the early 1980s, when he helped shape one of the company's most important aircraft, the Cessna 208 Caravan. His obituary in the New York Times reports that Wallace "severed his ties" with Cessna in 1983, following a dispute with his hand-picked successor, Meyer.

Dwane Wallace died at age 78, after a lengthy illness, on December 21, 1989.

Wallace had been a member of the Aviation Pioneers Hall of Fame, the Society of Experimental Test Pilots and the Quiet Birdmen.

== Honors ==
- 1934 – DeSilva Trophy, Miami All-American AIr Races
- 1936 – Argentine Trophy, Miami All-American AIr Races
- 1936 – Detroit News Trophy, Miami All-American AIr Races
- 1970 – Native Sons and Daughters' Kansan of the Year
- 1975 – Daniel Guggenheim Medal for achievements in the advancement of flight (Wallace was the first person in general aviation to win the award)
- 1981 – Wright Brothers Memorial Trophy, reportedly the most prestigious award in U.S. aviation, for his "distinguished leadership, mechanical innovation, engineering management and public service contributing to the development of aviation in the United States."
- 1990 – Enshrined in the Kansas Aviation Hall of Fame in Wichita, Kansas
- 2012 – Enshrined in the National Aviation Hall of Fame in Dayton, Ohio
- 2013 – Ranked No. 11 on Flying's list of the 51 Heroes of Aviation

Although Wallace was the principal force in the transformation of Cessna from a tiny, struggling company into the world's largest-volume producer of aircraft, he kept his uncle's last name on the company, rather than naming it after himself. However, in the 1960s, the Wallace name was attached to the company's new factory building, at the municipal airport on Wichita's southwest side.

Additionally, in 1979, the new main building of the College of Engineering at Wichita State University—his alma mater, which he had richly endowed—was named Wallace Hall for him.
