= National Aviation Hall of Fame =

Aviation museum, annual awards ceremony, learning and research center

Coordinates: 39°46′58.58″N 84°06′25.15″W

The National Aviation Hall of Fame (NAHF) is a museum, annual awards ceremony and learning and research center that was founded in 1962 as an Ohio non-profit corporation in Dayton, Ohio, United States, known as the "Birthplace of Aviation" with its connection to the Wright brothers. In 2017, the annual induction was held in Fort Worth, Texas, as the organization began rotating the ceremony among various cities.

== History ==
On July 14, 1964, the National Aviation Hall of Fame was chartered nationally by an act of the U.S. 88th Congress, public law 88-372 signed by President Lyndon B. Johnson. The organization continues today as a public foundation reporting annually to Congress. The primary support for this foundation comes from private, tax-deductible membership dues and contributions from individuals and organizations.

Its mission is to "honor aerospace legends to inspire future leaders" by realizing the tenacity, vision, persistence, skill and courage of the men and women of the air & space industry.

Principal activities since 1962 are the annual gala induction ceremonies for people selected for enshrinement, typically four to five per year. The selection process for induction into the National Aviation Hall of Fame involves a rigorous review and final selection process by a prestigious and knowledgeable group of aviation and space experts from around the country.

The enshrinement ceremony is often referred to as "The Oscar Night of Aviation". It is held in conjunction with the Wings of Women (WOW) mentoring program.

The National Aviation Hall of Fame is located adjacent to the National Museum of the United States Air Force. The museum covers many areas of flight including military, commercial, general and sport aviation, as well as space flight. It is open year-round with the exception of certain holidays.

== Enshrinees ==
The Hall has inducted the following people, arranged in alphabetical order, with their year of induction in parentheses.

- Bert Acosta (2014)
- Buzz Aldrin (2000)
- John R. Alison (2005)
- William McPherson Allen (1971)
- William Anders (2004)
- Bud Anderson (2008)
- Charles Alfred Anderson (2012)
- Frank M. Andrews (1986)
- Harry George Armstrong (1998)
- Neil Alden Armstrong (1979)
- Henry Harley Arnold (1967)
- J. Leland Atwood (1984)
- William F. Bahret (2026)
- Bernt Balchen (1973)
- Thomas Scott Baldwin (1964)
- Don Bateman (2024)
- Lincoln Beachey (1966)
- Alan LaVern Bean (2010)
- Olive Ann Beech (1973)
- Walter Herschel Beech (1977)
- Alexander Graham Bell (1965)
- Lawrence Dale Bell (1977)
- Giuseppe Mario Bellanca (1973)
- Vincent Hugo Bendix (1991)
- Velta Benn (2023)
- Guion Bluford (2019)
- William Edward Boeing (1966)
- Charles Bolden (2017)
- Richard Bong (1986)
- Frank Borman (1982)
- Albert Boyd (1984)
- Gregory "Pappy" Boyington (2019)
- Walter J. Boyne (2007)
- Mark E. Bradley (1992)
- Patrick Henry Brady (2012)
- George Scratchley Brown (1985)
- Willa Brown (2022)
- Clayton J. Brukner (1997)
- Eugene Bullard (2020)
- Gary Burrell (2024)
- Richard E. Byrd (1968)
- Robert Cardenas (2015)
- Marion E. Carl (2001)
- Eugene Cernan (2000)
- Scott Carpenter (2017)
- Clyde Vernon Cessna (1978)
- Peggy Chabrian (2024)
- Clarence Chamberlin (1976)
- Octave Chanute (1963)
- Claire Lee Chennault (1972)
- Joe Clark (2022)
- Julie Elizabeth Clark (2025)
- Jerrie Cobb (2012)
- Jacqueline Cochran (1971)
- Cornelius Coffey (2023)
- Bessie Coleman (2006)
- Eileen Collins (2009)
- Michael Collins (1985)
- Harry B. Combs (1996)
- Charles Conrad (1980)
- Laurence Craigie (2000)
- Frederick C. Crawford (1993)
- Robert L. Crippen (2016)
- Scott Crossfield (1983)
- Alfred A. Cunningham (1965)
- R. Walter Cunningham (2018)
- Glenn Hammond Curtiss (1964)
- John R. Dailey (2018)
- William H. Dana (2018)
- Herbert A. Dargue (1997)
- Benjamin O. Davis Jr. (1994)
- George Everett "Bud" Day (2016)
- Alexander P. de Seversky (1970)
- James Harold Doolittle (1967)
- Donald Wills Douglas Sr. (1969)
- Charles Stark Draper (1981)
- Charles Duke (2019)
- Ira Clarence Eaker (1970)
- Amelia Earhart (1968)
- Carl Benjamin Eielson (1985)
- Theodore G. Ellyson (1965)
- Eugene Burton Ely (1965)
- Joe H. Engle (2001)
- Frank Kendall Everest Jr. (1989)
- Maxime Faget (2020)
- Sherman Mills Fairchild (1979)
- Keith Ferris (2012)
- Reuben H. Fleet (1975)
- Ronald R. Fogleman (2018)
- Anthony Herman Gerard Fokker (1980)
- Henry Ford (1984)
- Joseph Jacob Foss (1984)
- Steve Fossett (2007)
- Benjamin Foulois (1963)
- Betty Skelton Frankman (2005)
- William John Frye (1992)
- Fitzhugh Fulton (1999)
- Francis Stanley Gabreski (1978)
- Joan Sullivan Garrett (2020)
- Dominic S. Gentile (1995)
- Hoot Gibson (2012)
- Robert J. Gilliland (2017)
- Robert R. Gilruth (1994)
- Angela Gittens (2023)
- John Herschel Glenn (1976)
- George William Goddard (1976)
- Robert Hutchings Goddard (1966)
- Arthur Godfrey (1987)
- John J. Goglia (2025)
- Barry Morris Goldwater (1982)
- Richard Francis Gordon Jr. (2020)
- Leonard Greene (2026)
- Frederick D. Gregory (2024)
- Warren G. Grimes (2010)
- Virgil I. Grissom (1987)
- Robert Ellsworth Gross (1970)
- Leroy Randle Grumman (1972)
- Harry Frank Guggenheim (1971)
- Fred Haise (2023)
- Margaret Hamilton (2022)
- Robert N. Hartzell (2015)
- Daniel J. Haughton (1987)
- Albert Francis Hegenberger (1976)
- Edward Henry Heinemann (1981)
- David Lee Hill (2006)
- Robert A. Hoover (1988)
- Howard Hughes (1973)
- David Sinton Ingalls (1983)
- Daniel James Jr. (1993)
- Mae Jemison (2025)
- Elrey Borge Jeppesen (1990)
- Clarence Leonard Johnson (1974)
- Evelyn Bryan Johnson (2007)
- Katherine Johnson (2024)
- Alvin M. Johnston (1993)
- Thomas V. Jones (1992)
- Paul Kaminski (2020)
- Min Kao (2024)
- Herbert D. Kelleher (2008)
- George Churchill Kenney (1971)
- Charles Franklin Kettering (1979)
- Iven Carl Kincheloe Jr. (2011)
- James Howard Kindelberger (1972)
- John and Martha King (2019)
- Joe W. Kittinger (1997)
- Alan and Dale Klapmeier (2014)
- A. Roy Knabenshue (1965)
- William J. "Pete" Knight (1988)
- Christopher C. Kraft Jr. (2016)
- Gene Kranz (2015)
- Hershel Clay Lacy (2010)
- Frank P. Lahm (1963)
- Samuel Pierpont Langley (1963)
- William Power Lear (1978)
- Curtis Emerson LeMay (1972)
- Anthony William LeVier (1978)
- Anne Morrow Lindbergh (1979)
- Charles Augustus Lindbergh (1967)
- Edwin Albert Link (1976)
- Allan H. Lockheed (1986)
- Grover Loening (1969)
- Nancy Harkness Love (2005)
- James Arthur Lovell (1998)
- Shannon Lucid (2026)
- Raoul Gervais Lufbery (1998)
- Frank Luke (1975)
- Paul B. MacCready (1991)
- John A. Macready (1968)
- Glenn Luther Martin (1966)
- David McCampbell (1996)
- James McDivitt (2014)
- James Smith McDonnell (1977)
- Charles McGee (2011)
- Thomas McGuire (2000)
- John C. Meyer (1988)
- Russell W. Meyer Jr. (2009)
- William "Billy" Mitchell (1966)
- Marc A. Mitscher (1989)
- Geraldine Mock (2022)
- William A. Moffett (2008)
- John J. Montgomery (1964)
- Thomas H. Moorer (1987)
- Sanford Alexander Moss (1976)
- Story Musgrave (2022)
- Gerhard Neumann (1986)
- Lloyd W. "Fig" Newton (2025)
- Ruth Rowland Nichols (1992)
- Carl L. Norden (1994)
- John Knudsen Northrop (1974)
- Robin Olds (2001)
- Phoebe Fairgrave Omlie (2025)
- Clyde Edward Pangborn (1995)
- William Allan Patterson (1976)
- Ross Perot Jr. (2026)
- Frank Piasecki (2002)
- William Thomas Piper (1980)
- Harold Frederick Pitcairn (1995)
- Paul Howard Poberezny (1999)
- Thomas Paul Poberezny (2016)
- Wiley Hardeman Post (1969)
- Elwood Richard Quesada (2012)
- Harriet Quimby (2004)
- Albert Cushing Read (1965)
- Robert Campbell Reeve (1975)
- Frederick Brant Rentschler (1982)
- Ben Rich (2005)
- Holden Chester Richardson (1978)
- Edward Vernon Rickenbacker (2004)
- Sally Ride (2007)
- Jack Ridley (2004)
- Cliff Robertson (2006)
- S. Harry Robertson III (2011)
- Frank Robinson (2025)
- Calbraith Perry Rodgers (1964)
- Will Rogers (1977)
- Robert A. Rushworth (1990)
- Burt Rutan (1995)
- Dick Rutan (2002)
- T. Claude Ryan (1974)
- Walter M. Schirra (1986)
- Bernard Adolf Schriever (1980)
- Thomas Selfridge (1965)
- Alan Shepard (1977)
- Igor Ivan Sikorsky (1968)
- Abe Silverstein (2015)
- Robert Forman Six (1980)
- Donald K. Slayton (1996)
- C. R. Smith (1974)
- Frederick W. Smith (2007)
- Carl Andrew Spaatz (1967)
- Elmer Ambrose Sperry (1973)
- Lawrence Burst Sperry (1981)
- Thomas P. Stafford (1997)
- Robert M. Stanley (1990)
- John Paul Stapp (1985)
- Lloyd Stearman (1989)
- James Stewart (2009)
- Edward Stimpson (2023)
- Katherine Stinson (2019)
- James Stockdale (2002)
- Sully Sullenberger (2026)
- Kathryn Sullivan (2023)
- Joe Sutter (2024)
- Charles Edward Taylor (1965)
- Louise Thaden (1999)
- Lowell Thomas (1992)
- Paul W. Tibbets (1996)
- John Henry Towers (1966)
- Juan Terry Trippe (1970)
- Sean D. Tucker (2008)
- Roscoe Turner (1975)
- Nathan Farragut Twining (1976)
- Albert Lee Ueltschi (2001)
- Hoyt S. Vandenberg (1991)
- Wernher von Braun (1982)
- Theodore von Kármán (1983)
- Hans P. von Ohain (1990)
- Chance M. Vought (1989)
- Leigh Wade (1974)
- Patty Wagstaff (2004)
- Henry W. Walden (1964)
- Dwane Wallace (2012)
- Emily Warner (2014)
- Edward Curtis Wells (1991)
- Richard T. Whitcomb (2012)
- Edward White (2009)
- Robert M. White (2006)
- Thomas D. White (2011)
- Peggy Whitson (2026)
- Frank Whittle (2017)
- Noel Wien (2010)
- Sam Barlow Williams (1998)
- Thornton Arnold Wilson (1983)
- Steve Wittman (2014)
- Collett Everman Woolman (1994)
- Orville and Wilbur Wright (1962)
- Charles Elwood Yeager (1973)
- John W. Young (1988)
- Hubert Zemke (2002)

== See also ==
- North American aviation halls of fame
- Wright Brothers Memorial Trophy
- Living Legends of Aviation
