= General Aviation Revitalization Act =

1994 US public law

- Long title: Senate Bill: S. 1458 (103rd) General Aviation Revitalization Act of 1994
- Acronyms (colloquial): GARA
- Nicknames: GARA

Legislative history
- Introduced in the Senate by Nancy Kassebaum (R–KS) on Sep 14, 1993 (103rd Congress, 1993–1994); Passed the Senate Aug. 1, 1994 on; Signed into law by President President Bill Clinton on Aug 17, 1994.

The General Aviation Revitalization Act of 1994, also known by its initials GARA, is Public Law 103-298, an Act of Congress on Senate Bill S. 1458 (103rd Congress), amending the Federal Aviation Act of 1958.

It was intended to counteract the effects of prolonged product liability on general aviation aircraft manufacturers, by limiting the duration of their liability for the aircraft they produce.

GARA is a statute of repose generally shielding most manufacturers of aircraft (carrying fewer than 20 passengers), and aircraft parts, from liability for most accidents (including injury or fatality accidents) involving their products that are 18 years old or older (at the time of the accident), even if manufacturer negligence was a cause.

While GARA is considered a landmark event in the modern history of America's general aviation industry, debate continues over the effects and ethics of GARA.

== History ==
=== General aviation industry decline in the 1980s and 1990s ===
==== Manufacturing downturn ====
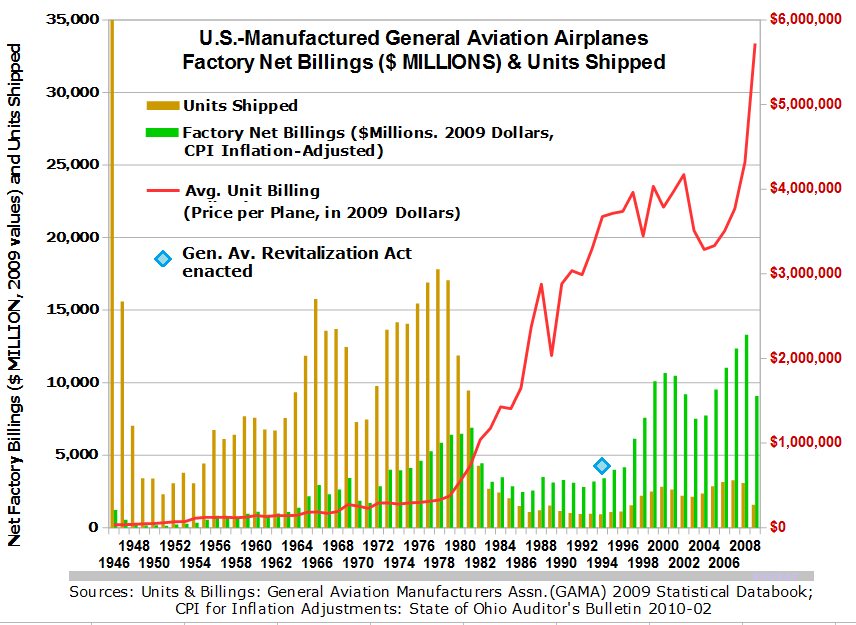

General aviation aircraft production in the U.S. -- following its 30-year peak in the late 1970s—dropped sharply over the next few years to a fraction of its original volume—from approximately 18,000 units in 1978, to 4,000 units in 1986, to 928 units in 1994. (In a 1993 speech, Sen. John McCain said "nearly 500 last year [1992]".)

General aviation aircraft manufacturers in the 1980s and 1990s began to terminate or reduce production of their piston-powered propeller aircraft, or struggled with solvency.

At the time, industry analysts estimated that the U.S. decline in general aviation aircraft manufacturing eliminated somewhere between 28,000 and 100,000 jobs—as unit production dropped by 95% between the 1970s peak and the early 1990s—sharply different from other segments of the global aerospace industry, where U.S. market share was still strong.

==== Product liability costs ====
Those manufacturers reported rapidly rising product liability costs, driving aircraft prices beyond the market, and they said their production cuts were in response to that growing liability.

Average cost of manufacturer's liability insurance for each airplane manufactured in the U.S. had risen from approximately $50 per plane in 1962 to $100,000 per plane in 1988, according to a report cited by the Bureau of Labor Statistics, a 2,000-fold increase in 24 years.

Rising claims against the industry triggered a rapid increase in manufacturers' liability insurance premiums during the 1980s. Industry-wide, in just 7 years, the manufacturers' liability premiums increased nearly nine-fold, from approximately $24 million in 1978 to $210 million in 1985.

Insurance underwriters worldwide began to refuse to sell product liability insurance to U.S. general aviation manufacturers. By 1987, the three largest GA manufacturers claimed their annual costs for product liability ranged from $70,000 to $100,000 per airplane built and shipped that year.

==== Product liability factors ====
Industry representatives and analysts variously blamed one or more of three general factors for rising product liability costs:

1. Long-lived products - General aviation aircraft manufacturers chiefly specialized in small and light aircraft which often remained in operation for several decades after their manufacture, much longer than automobiles or even most commercial aviation airliners.
2. Higher fatality rate (per passenger, per mile traveled) for general aviation aircraft than most other forms of transportation.
3. Changes in the legal system including the rise of the rule of strict liability, increasingly applied by courts nationwide during the 1960s and 1970s, so that aircraft product liability lawsuits became a rapidly rising area of specialty for the legal profession in the 1980s, with some attorneys successfully specializing in targeting general aviation aircraft manufacturers and insurers.

==== Other changes to general aviation economics ====
However, other economics of general aviation had also begun to erode the market for light aircraft, including: rising insurance rates and restrictions for aircraft manufacturers, owners, operators, and maintenance providers, largely in response to the accident-liability issues; inflation and recession, and rising interest rates in the general economy; termination of the investment tax credit for light aircraft purchases; aircraft market saturation (due partly to accumulated numbers of old, but still flyable, light aircraft built in abundance during the industry's economically favorable "boom" years); kitplane and foreign aircraft competition (and inadequate response by US manufacturers); declines in consumer discretionary income; the changing demographics of income and wealth distribution, reducing the number of potential buyers; sharply increased fuel costs; urban sprawl competing with airport space; and regulatory restrictions. The decline in sales reportedly resulted in a decline in the number of aircraft dealers, further exacerbating the decline in sales.

The 1981 labor-relations battle between President Reagan and FAA air traffic controllers, and Reagan's subsequent firing of most U.S. air traffic controllers, resulted in significant reductions of U.S. flight operations—particularly in general aviation, which was subjected to a new system of "flow control" regulating flights from busy airports, undermining the utility of general aviation in the U.S.

Also cited by some was an unsustainable surge in student pilots, triggered by the proposed elimination of government-funded private pilot training under the GI Bill for military veterans—with veterans scrambling to get the training while it was still available. The surge, some analysts have indicated, consumed most of the veterans' demand for flight-training that would have been spread out over several years if there had been no fear of program discontinuance. This surge in student (and subsequently licensed private) pilots also triggered a transient surge in orders for light aircraft—for training and personal use—which also quickly consumed the veteran-related aircraft demand that would normally have been spread out more evenly over several years—creating, instead, a sudden, fleeting "peak" in aircraft purchases in the late 1970s, in place of what might otherwise have been a lower, longer, more-even "plateau" in the data.

==== Cumulative effect on manufacturers ====
As a consequence of these factors, apparently, general aviation aircraft manufacturers began to experience sharply declining revenues and rising costs, in the 1980s, with resulting declines in income, and rising contingent liabilities.

==== General aviation manufacturers' changes ====
The three leading general aviation aircraft manufacturers (accounting for over half of U.S. general aviation aircraft production) underwent major negative changes, which each blamed at least partially on rising product liability costs. Specifically:

Cessna Aircraft Company, long the world's highest-volume aircraft producer, and largest general aviation aircraft manufacturer, posted its first-ever annual loss in 1983. Following acquisition by General Dynamics Corporation in September 1985, Cessna suspended all propeller aircraft production in 1986 (except the Cessna 208 Caravan commercial/utility turboprop). Cessna Chairman Russell W. Meyer, Jr. said it was in response to rising product liability costs, and Meyer promised to return Cessna to propeller aircraft production if (and when) the Congress passed satisfactory changes in product liability law. In the meantime, Cessna shifted its focus to business jets and commercial/utility turboprop aircraft.

Piper Aircraft went in and out of bankruptcy, under various names, suspending or eliminating some long-popular models from its product line, such as the 2-seat Piper Super Cub (one of the longest-built airplanes in the world), and 6-seat Piper PA-32 "Cherokee Six"/"Saratoga".

Beech Aircraft was acquired by Raytheon Corporation (and renamed Raytheon Aircraft), which shifted the company's emphasis away from general aviation propeller aircraft, like the Beech Bonanza and Beech Baron, and discontinued all other piston-propeller aircraft models (from the 2-seat, single-engine Model 77 Beech Skipper trainer to the 7-seat, twin-engine, pressurized Model 60 Beech Duke), directing company emphasis towards professionally operated corporate turboprops and business jets, and small military and commercial aircraft.

==== General aviation aircraft shortages ====
As a consequence of these changes, and others, the general aviation industry began to suffer from a shortage of new aircraft, particularly for training, rental and charter use. The three main training planes of the industry in the 1980s, the two-seat Cessna 152, Piper Tomahawk, and Beechcraft Skipper, were all removed from the market in the early-to-mid 1980s, and none of them ever returned.

=== GARA promoted and opposed ===
During the 1980s and 1990s, under the leadership of Cessna Chairman Russ Meyer and GAMA President Ed Stimpson, the industry pressured Congress, for several years, to enact limits on aircraft manufacturers' product liability. The proposed legislation became known as the "General Aviation Revitalization Act (GARA).

Proponents (advocates) included:

- the General Aviation Manufacturers Association (GAMA), particularly represented by Russ Meyer, Cessna's Chairman & CEO;
- the Aircraft Owners & Pilots Association (AOPA), the main U.S. organization for owners and pilots of general aviation aircraft.
- the International Association of Machinists and Aerospace Workers Union (IAM)/(IAMAW) - the labor union representing workers at several general aviation manufacturers' factories;
- Kansas politicians, led by U.S. Senator Nancy Kassebaum (Kansas is the nation's leading producer of general aviation aircraft);

Opponents included (chiefly):

- Lawsuit attorneys, represented by the Association of Trial Lawyers of America (ATLA). The proposed legislation directly threatened their power and wealth, and would create a potentially wide-ranging precedent that could lead to similar legislation affecting lawsuits over other products and issues.
- Public-interest / consumer advocacy groups, including Public Citizen. However, Rodengen quotes GAMA President Ed Stimpson as claiming that simplification of the bill, eliminating all aspects but the statute of repose, won "additional support" of "consumer organizations".

Promoters included Members of Congress. Some, with connections to general aviation were among the forces mobilized to pass the legislation, including:

- U.S. Senator Nancy Landon Kassebaum (R-Kansas) from the home state of Cessna, Beech Aircraft/Raytheon Aircraft, the Learjet division of Bombardier Aerospace, and light sport aircraft manufacturer Rans Designs. Kassebaum led the Congressional effort, and co-sponsored the legislation with Rep. Glickman (below). Kassebaum gathered more than 60 "co-sponsors" for the bill in the 100-seat, Democrat-dominated U.S. Senate.
- U.S. Representative Dan Glickman (D-Kansas) from Wichita, "the Air Capital City" the hometown of Cessna, Beech Aircraft/Raytheon Aircraft, and the Learjet division of Bombardier Aerospace, and many other aviation enterprises. Glickman co-sponsored the legislation with Sen. Kassebaum (above), and aided by Rep. James V. Hansen (below) gathered more than 300 "co-sponsors" for the bill in the Democrat-dominated, 435-seat House of Representatives.
- U.S. Representative James V. Hansen (R-Utah), who successfully persuaded GARA backers (particularly GAMA) to support a simpler bill, and then helped Rep. Glickman acquire more than 300 "co-sponsors" for the bill in the House of Representatives.
- U.S. Senator James Inhofe (R-Oklahoma), a general aviation pilot from the home state of Aero Commander / Commander Aircraft, who provided substantial support to the proposed legislation.

Congressional support included:

- U.S. Senator John McCain (R-Arizona), a retired career Naval aviator, who gave a sponsoring speech in favor of the GARA, Nov.11, 1993 on the floor of the U.S. Senate.
- U.S. Senator Kay Bailey Hutchison (R-Texas), who offered a defense to Sen. Metzenbaum's critique, remarks, March 16, 1994 on the floor of the U.S. Senate.

Congressional opposition included:

- Senate Judiciary Committee
- House Judiciary Committee
- U.S. Representative Jack Brooks (D-Texas), Chairman of the House Judiciary Committee, who had a reputation for blocking liability reform. Brooks' committee sat on the bill, initially, but when it appeared his committee might be bypassed by a discharge petition, Brooks scheduled hearings on the bill in his committee, which eventually passed the GARA with amendments.
- U.S. Senator Howard Metzenbaum (D-Ohio), who gave a detailed speech, March 16, 1994 on the floor of the U.S. Senate, critiquing the proposed provisions of the GARA.
- U.S. Senator Fritz Hollings (D-South Carolina), who objected to Sen. Kassebaum's attempt to attach the GARA as an amendment to his regular Fiscal 1994 FAA Reauthorization Bill. Hollings finally agreed to support a version of GARA, as a separate bill, that delayed protection from the original 15 years to the finally-successful 18 years.

The bill's language was reportedly drafted by Sen. Kassebaum (R-Kansas), Rep. Glickman (D-Kansas) and GAMA/Cessna Chairman Russ Meyer, with Meyer pushing for simplification to a bill focused only on a statute of repose, and no other purpose. Meyer also promoted the bill as a "jobs" bill, to win the support of aircraft industry unions and other organized labor, traditionally popular with Democrats (who, at the time, controlled both houses of Congress).

However, in a January 2008 article in the Seattle Univ. Law Review, Kerry Kovarik argues that the exact language of the final draft of the Act exceeded the intent of Congress, as indicated by the generating committees and the Congressional debate record, creating "inequities" and poor judicial interpretations, with unintended negative consequences for crash victims, far beyond what Congress intended, to include any aircraft with less than 20 passenger seats, operated in any activity other than scheduled commercial service, including helicopters and business jets, despite a lack of Congressional discussion of those exemptions.

=== GARA passed ===
The General Aviation Revitalization Act was passed by the Congress in 1994, and signed by President Bill Clinton in a White House ceremony August 17, 1994.

The final law exempted manufacturers of general aviation aircraft (aircraft with less than 20 passenger seats, not operated in scheduled commercial service), and their component parts, from liability for any of their products that were 18 years old or older at the time of the accident.

Certain exceptions apply:

- If the manufacturer withheld or concealed information from the FAA, or misrepresented information, that is directly related to the accident's cause;
- If the accident victim is a passenger on an air ambulance flight, or otherwise in flight, to get medical treatment;
- If an otherwise-exempt aircraft killed or injured someone not aboard the aircraft (e.g.: a person on the ground, struck by the aircraft); or
- In suits over a written warranty involving an otherwise-exempt aircraft.

Furthermore, when a part is installed as addition, modification or replacement, exemption for claims of liability arising out of this part kicks in 18 years after installation of that part. So a 20-year-old aircraft may still be the object of a successful suit against a manufacturer in regards of manufacturer modifications or parts installed within the last 18 years.

== Outcomes ==
There is debate about the results of the GARA. Some believe it has revitalized the industry, and some believe it has made little difference, even encouraging continued or resumed production of high-risk vehicles.

=== Manufacturing outcomes ===
Following passage of the GARA, U.S. general aviation aircraft production, in units, roughly doubled in five years, but still remained far below the 1970s production quantities (see graph). Meanwhile, contrary to an implied goal of GARA, average general aviation aircraft prices continued to rise. This was largely attributable to the shift of GA manufacturers towards building high-end turbine (turboprop and jet) business and luxury aircraft, while keeping piston aircraft productions at a small fraction of their 1970s levels. The manufacturers were able to get increased income with smaller numbers of far-more-expensive airplanes (see graph).

The "big three" GA planemakers reacted to the enactment of GARA in differing ways:

Cessna, in 1997, resumed very limited propeller aircraft production of its two most popular (and statistically safest) models that had been suspended in 1986; the 172 and 182. In 1998, they resumed the 206. Cessna Chairman and CEO Russell W. Meyer said it was in response to passage of GARA, and in keeping with his "promise". However, Cessna did not resume production of most of its propeller aircraft line; including its most efficient and high-performance piston-propeller aircraft, or any of its twin-engined propeller aircraft. Cessna continued to focus chiefly on business jets and commercial/utility turboprop aircraft.

Piper Aircraft (alias "New Piper Aircraft") continued in and out of troubles, but continued producing the types that had survived during the 1980s; and restored some that it had cut from its product line, such as the single-engine PA-32, reintroduced in 1995, the year after GARA was enacted; and twin-engine Seneca and Seminole. Some credit GARA with helping New Piper to emerge from bankruptcy and survive.

Beechcraft (by then renamed Raytheon Aircraft) continued production of the two piston-engine aircraft models that had survived the pre-GARA shakeout, the Bonanza and Baron, but never resumed production of any of the types that it had cut during the GARA debate.

The General Accounting Office of the U.S. Congress estimated, after GARA's passage, that 25,000 new jobs had been created, exactly the quantity predicted at the hearings. However, the public-interest advocacy group Public Citizen has cited testimony March 1997 by Cessna senior vice president John E. Moore, before the Senate Commerce Committee, March 6, 1997, acknowledging that Cessna's product liability costs had not been reduced after the passage of the GARA. In fact, purchase prices of various types of light aircraft (including some Piper, Beech and reintroduced Cessna models) went up sharply during the early years of GARA, leaving doubt about industry representatives' claims that GARA would cut airplane prices.

=== Liability diffusion ===
Since GARA, attorneys have begun pressing other segments of the general aviation industry and community as alternative defendants to the manufacturers, including:

- parts manufacturers
- maintenance organizations
- flight instructors and utility/charter pilots
- flight schools
- aircraft owners' insurance and personal assets

(This list includes "FBOs" (fixed-base operators) typically airport-based aviation service businesses providing flight training, charter flying, rental aircraft, aircraft storage, fueling and/or maintenance.)

The result of shifted liability focus has been an increase in costs elsewhere in the industry, and directly to aircraft owners and pilots, and their estates.

=== Safety outcomes ===
Economists Eric Helland (Claremont McKenna College) and Alexander Tabarrok (George Mason University) have argued that the outcomes of GARA demonstrate that product liability limits motivate safer behavior by consumers.

However, others have argued that safety improvement in general aviation have been chiefly the result of a market shift away from owner-flown aircraft, towards professionally operated aircraft, and due to other changes, such as improving technology, advances in pilot education and training, and better operating methods and practices." A reduction in flight hours, owing to economic factors, is also suspected to contribute to a decline in accidents.
