= Frank Shrontz =

American businessman and government official (1931–2024)

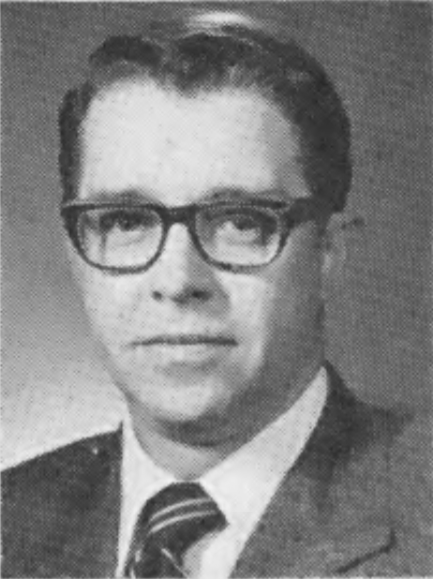

President and Chief Executive Officer, Boeing
- In office 1986–1996
- Preceded by: Thornton Wilson
- Succeeded by: Philip M. Condit

Assistant Secretary of Defense for Installations and Logistics
- In office February 10, 1976 – January 19, 1977
- President: Gerald R. Ford
- Preceded by: John J. Bennett (Acting)
- Succeeded by: position abolished

Assistant Secretary of the Air Force for Installations and Logistics
- In office 1973–1976
- President: Richard Nixon; Gerald R. Ford
- Preceded by: Lewis E. Turner (acting)
- Succeeded by: J. Gordon Knapp

Personal details
- Born: Frank Anderson Shrontz; December 14, 1931 Boise, Idaho, U.S.
- Died: May 3, 2024 (aged 92) Seattle, Washington, U.S.
- Spouse: Harriet A. Houghton (died 2012)
- Education: University of Idaho (LLB); Harvard University (MBA)
- Occupation: Corporate Executive

Military service
- Branch/service: United States Army
- Years of service: 1954–1956

Frank Anderson Shrontz (December 14, 1931 – May 3, 2024) was an American corporate executive and government official. He was chief executive officer and chairman of the Boeing Company. He also served in the United States Department of Defense during the presidential administrations of Richard Nixon and Gerald Ford.

== Early life ==
Born on December 14, 1931, and raised in Boise, Idaho, Shrontz was the son of a sporting goods merchant. He graduated from Boise High School in 1949 and the University of Idaho in Moscow in 1954 with a Bachelor of Laws degree. While there, he served as chapter president of Beta Theta Pi fraternity.

Following a commission and service in the U.S. Army from 1954–1956, he attended the Harvard Business School where he received a Master of Business Administration in 1958. He worked for the Eli Lilly and Company while he was in graduate school, but accepted a job with Boeing in 1958.

== Career ==
Beginning in 1973, Shrontz served in the United States Department of Defense during the presidencies of Richard Nixon and Gerald Ford. He returned to Boeing in January 1977 as a vice president in charge of contract administration and planning. He later became a division head managing production of 707, 727, and 737 aircraft.

During the oil crisis of the 1970s, he was a proponent of the mid-range 737 jetliner rather than the longer range and more fuel efficient 757 and 767. This was a successful decision financially, as stabilizing oil prices and airline deregulation soon led the 737 to become Boeing's top selling airframe. The move was later described "either lucky or prescient."

Shrontz became president of Boeing in 1984 and served as CEO from 1986–1996. He was chairman of the board from 1988 to 1997. His tenure started on a high note, but followed by the 1990-1991 recession and the end of the Cold War, whilst Shrontz pushed Boeing into the space industry and a contract to build parts of the International Space Station. 777, designed from the ground up and in five years, was the first major result of Shrontz’s restructuring: earning the company hundreds of billions of dollars, compared to the 4 billion it cost to develop.

In 1996, Shrontz was succeeded as CEO by Phil Condit.

Shrontz served on the boards of 3M, Boise Cascade, and Chevron, and as a citizen regent on the Smithsonian Institution's Board of Regents. He was part of the group that purchased the Seattle Mariners of Major League Baseball in 1992 and was on the team's board of directors.

While he was serving on the board of directors of Chevron, a new double-hulled supertanker was named in his honor in November 1998. The South Korean-built ship was renamed the Antares Voyager in 2003 after it changed owners.

== Personal life ==
Shrontz married Harriet Ann Houghton, whom he met at the University of Idaho, in 1954. They had three sons and were married for 58 years. She died in 2012.

Shrontz was inducted into the Junior Achievement U.S. Business Hall of Fame in 2004. Boeing endowed the Frank Shrontz Endowed Chair of Professional Ethics at Seattle University beginning in 1997. He was awarded the Oxford Cup, Beta Theta Pi's most prestigious award, in 1999.

Shrontz died in Seattle on May 3, 2024, at the age of 92.

Business positions
Preceded by Thornton Wilson	CEO of Boeing; 1986–1996	Succeeded by Phil Condit
