= Joe Sutter =

American engineer, Boeing Airplane Company (1921–2016)

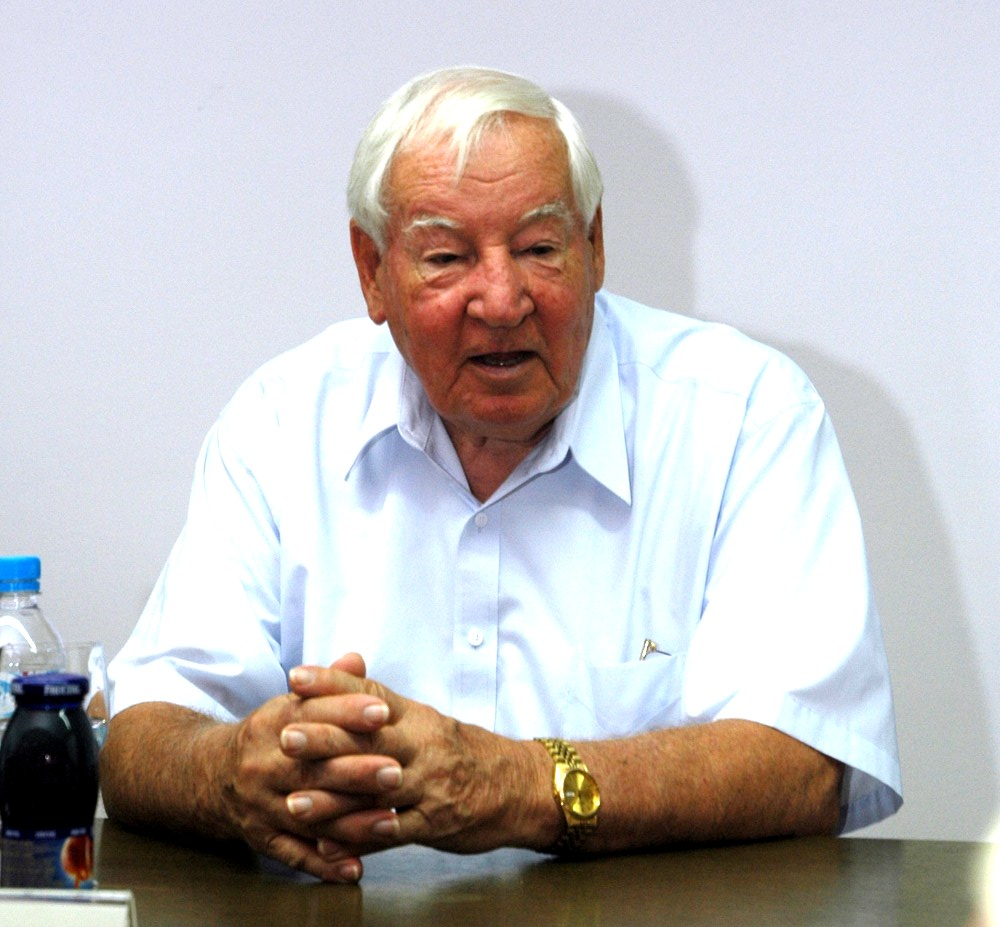
- Sutter in 2006
- Born: March 21, 1921; Seattle, Washington, U.S.
- Died: August 30, 2016 (aged 95); Bremerton, Washington, U.S.
- Education: University of Washington (BS)
- Employer: Boeing Commercial Airplanes
- Known for: Chief engineer for the development of the Boeing 747
- Notable work: 747: Creating the World's First Jumbo Jet and Other Adventures from a Life in Aviation
- Spouse: Nancy French
- Children: 3
- Awards: United States Medal of Technology (1985); Daniel Guggenheim Medal (1990); American Institute of Aeronautics and Astronautics Aircraft Award; Wright Brothers Memorial Trophy

Joseph Frederick Sutter (March 21, 1921 – August 30, 2016) was an American engineer for the Boeing Airplane Company and manager of the design team for the Boeing 747 under Malcolm T. Stamper, the head of the 747 project. Air & Space/Smithsonian magazine has described Sutter as the "father of the 747".

== Early life and education ==
Sutter was born in Seattle, Washington, and grew up in the vicinity of Boeing's Seattle plant. He was of Slovenian descent; his father, Franc Suhadolc (1879–1945) from Dobrova, Slovenia, moved to the US as a gold prospector. Sutter attended the University of Washington and graduated with a bachelor's degree in aeronautical engineering in 1943.

== Career ==
In 1940, Sutter took a summer job at Boeing Plant 2 while studying aeronautical engineering at the University of Washington. Sutter served as a junior officer aboard the destroyer escort USS Edward H. Allen (DE-531) in the U.S. Navy during World War II.

He was a young U.S. Navy veteran finishing his degree when both Boeing and Douglas offered him jobs. Boeing believed in jet aircraft, so he went there. Former Boeing executive Jim Albaugh believes Douglas would probably own Boeing today if it had gone otherwise.

At Boeing, Sutter worked on many commercial airplane projects, including the 367-80 "Dash 80", 707, 727, and 737. He eventually became a manager for the new jumbo-sized wide body airplane, the four-engine Boeing 747. As chief engineer, he led the 747 design and build team from conception in 1965 to rollout in 1969. He became known as the "father of the 747".

Sutter's final job was as executive vice president for commercial airplane engineering and product development when he retired from Boeing in 1986.

== Later life ==
Sutter served on the Rogers Commission, investigating the Space Shuttle Challenger disaster. He was also selected as a recipient of the International Air Cargo Association's 2002 Hall of Fame Award and was an engineering sales consultant. As of July 2010, he was a member of the Boeing Senior Advisory Group, which was studying the alternatives of a clean sheet replacement of the Boeing 737 or a re-engine of the then-current design, the latter ultimately chosen and later marketed as the Boeing 737 MAX. For decades, he resided in West Seattle. In 2011, on his 90th birthday, Boeing's 40-87 building in Everett, WA, the main engineering building for Boeing Commercial Airplanes division, was renamed the Joe Sutter building. Sutter died on August 30, 2016, at a hospital in Bremerton, Washington, from complications of pneumonia, at the age of 95.

He is memorialized by Atlas Air's final 747 (N863GT), the 1,574th and final 747 ever made by the company, via a sticker with a picture of him, the first ever 747, his name, and the words "Forever Incredible". Atlas Air took delivery of the aircraft on January 31, 2023.

== Book ==
Aviation author and historian Jay Spenser worked closely with Sutter for 18 months to write his autobiography, entitled 747: Creating the World's First Jumbo Jet and Other Adventures from a Life in Aviation (ISBN 0-06-088241-7). It was published by Smithsonian Books/HarperCollins as a hardcover in 2006 and as a paperback in 2007. This book tells of Sutter's childhood and describes his life and 40-year career at Boeing.

The book details Sutter's tenure as chief engineer of the development of the 747 and elaborates on its design, manufacturing, testing, certification, and delivery to the world's airlines. The book also describes subsequent models of the 747 and the two major-derivative updates to the type, the 747-400 of 1989, and the 747-8.

== Awards ==
- 1985 United States Medal of Technology award. For his contributions to the development of commercial jet aircraft.
- In September 2024, Sutter was inducted into the National Aviation Hall of Fame in Dayton, Ohio.
