= Mark Edward Bradley =

American pilot and US Air Force general (1907–1999)

Mark E. Bradley
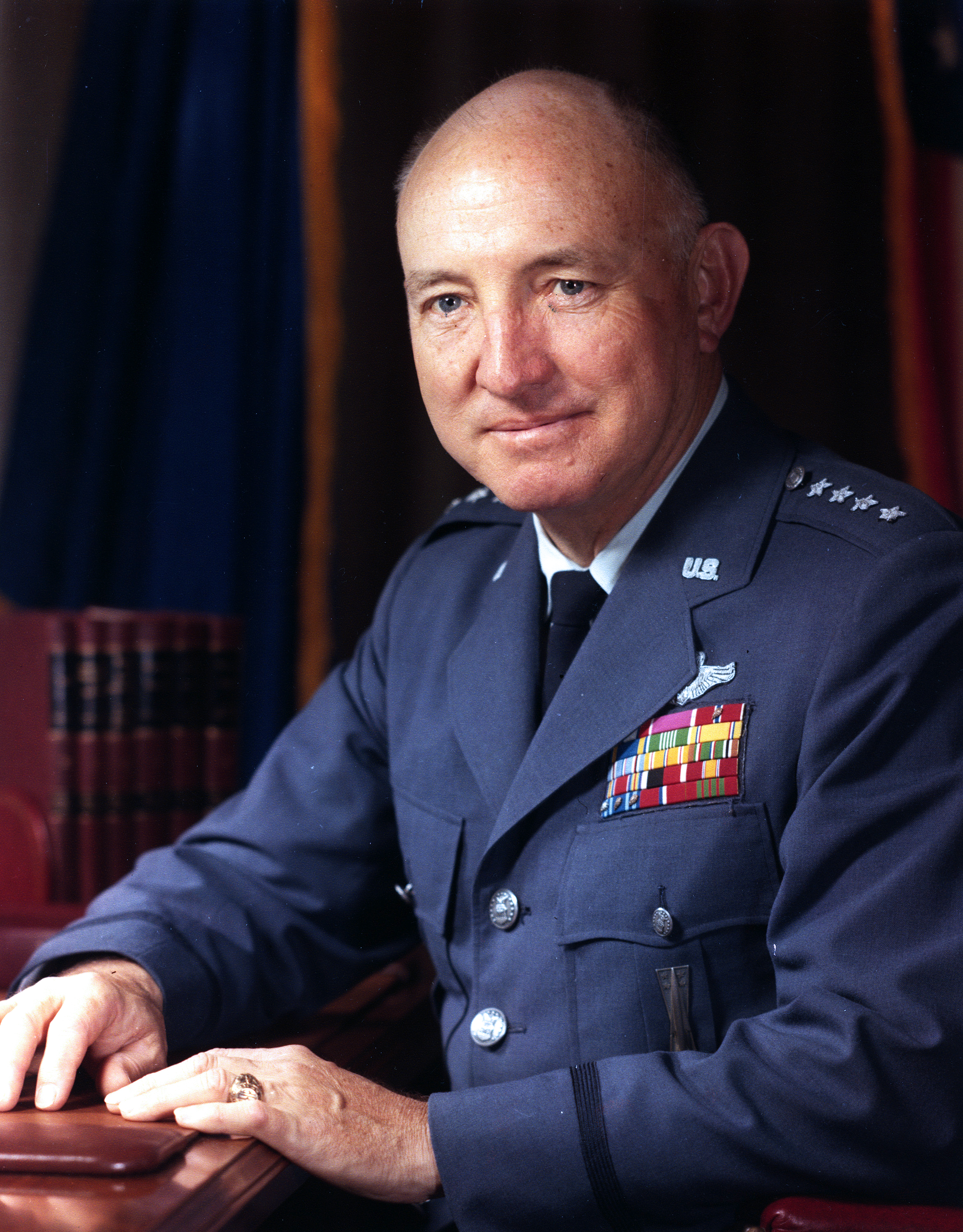
- General Mark Edward Bradley
- Born: December 10, 1907; Clemson, South Carolina, U.S.
- Died: May 22, 1999 (aged 91); Riverside, California, U.S.
- Military career
- Allegiance: United States of America
- Branch: United States Air Force
- Service years: 1930–1965
- Rank: General
- Commands: Air Force Logistics Command; 301st Fighter Wing
- Conflicts: World War II
- Awards: Distinguished Service Medal (2); Legion of Merit; Bronze Star (2); Air Medal; Croix de Guerre

Mark Edward Bradley Jr. (December 10, 1907 – May 22, 1999) was a United States Air Force general and a pioneering aviator. He served as commander of the U.S. Air Force Logistics Command.

== Early life ==
On December 10, 1907, Bradley was born in Clemson, South Carolina. Bradley attended Clemson High School.

== Education ==
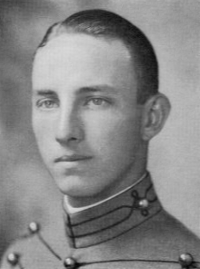
As a West Point cadet

Bradley attended Clemson A&M College. In June 1930, Bradley graduated from the United States Military Academy. Bradley was commissioned a second lieutenant of Field Artillery. In 1931, Bradley graduated from flying school and was rated a pilot. In 1934, he graduated from the Air Corps Technical School and assigned to the 18th Pursuit Group at Schofield Barracks, Hawaii. In July 1938, Bradley graduated from the Engineering School at Wright Field, Ohio.

== Career ==
Bradley's first assignment as an Air Corps officer was at Selfridge Field, Michigan, where he served as a fighter pilot in the 27th Pursuit Squadron.

General Bradley became a test pilot in the Flight Test Section. Bradley became the P-47 project officer, a project officer in the Pursuit Branch of the Materiel Division, chief of the Fighter Branch, and chief of the Flight Test Section.

Going to Europe in January 1945, General Bradley became deputy commanding officer of the 1st Tactical Air Force Service Command. In May 1945 he was assigned to the Fifth Air Force in the Philippines, becoming chief of staff in October 1945, on its subsequent move to Japan. In February 1946 he assumed command of the 301st Fighter Wing on Okinawa where he remained until October 1946.

In November 1946 General Bradley was assigned to the Armed Forces Staff College at Norfolk, Virginia, as assistant director of the college's Plans and Operations Division.

Returning to Wright-Patterson Air Force Base, Ohio, in April 1948, the general was appointed to the Air Materiel Command's Directorate of Procurement and Industrial Planning as deputy director, becoming director of procurement and production in July 1951.

In April 1953, General Bradley was named assistant chief of staff for materiel, U.S. Air Forces in Europe, with headquarters in Wiesbaden, Germany. In August he became deputy commander in chief and chief of staff, USAFE.

Returning to the United States in July 1956, General Bradley was appointed assistant deputy chief of staff for materiel at Air Force Headquarters, Washington, D.C. He became deputy chief of staff for materiel on June 30, 1959. His position was redesignated deputy chief of staff for systems and logistics in 1961.

On July 1, 1962, General Bradley became commander of Air Force Logistics Command at Wright-Patterson Air Force Base, Ohio. In 1962, Bradley was promoted to a four-star general.

On August 1, 1965, Bradley retired from the United States Air Force.

On August 2, 1965, Bradley became an assistant to the president at Garrett Corporation in Los Angeles, California. In December 1965, Bradley became an executive vice-president of the Garrett Corporation, until his retirement in December 1972.

== Awards and recognitions ==
Among his decorations are the Air Force Distinguished Service Medal with oak leaf cluster, the Legion of Merit, the Bronze Star with oak leaf cluster, the Air Medal and the French Croix de Guerre. A command pilot, he flew six combat missions during World War II for a total of 32 combat hours. His campaign ribbons – all with battle stars – include the European-African-Middle Eastern Campaign Medal, Asiatic-Pacific Campaign Medal and the Philippine Liberation Ribbon.

- 1992 National Aviation Hall of Fame

== Personal life ==
Bradley was the son of Prof. Mark Edward Bradley, who served as head of the English Department at the Clemson Agricultural College, and Mary Elizabeth (Morrah) Bradley.

Bradley married Alice Cecelia Newman on July 7, 1934. They had a daughter and a son.

Bradley died in Riverside, California on May 22, 1999. Bradley and his wife were buried at the United States Military Academy Post Cemetery.
