= Olive Ann Beech =

American businesswoman (1903–1993)

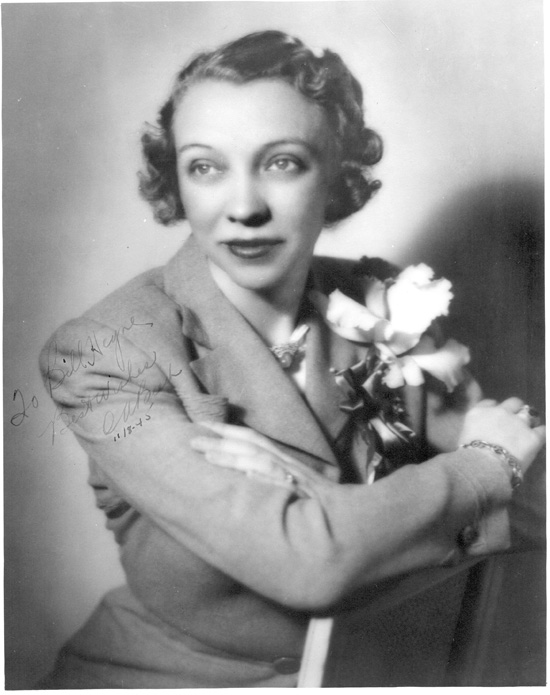
- Ann Beech, signed November 8, 1945
- Born: Olive Ann Mellor; September 25, 1903; Waverly, Kansas, U.S.
- Died: July 6, 1993 (aged 89); Wichita, Kansas, U.S.
- Known for: First Lady of Aviation, Co-founder of Beechcraft
- Spouse: Walter Herschel Beech
- Children: 2
- Awards: Wright Brothers Memorial Trophy (1980); National Aviation Hall of Fame (1981)

Olive Ann Beech (September 25, 1903 – July 6, 1993) was an American aerospace businesswoman who was the co-founder, president, and chairwoman of the Beech Aircraft Corporation. She founded the company in 1932 with her husband, Walter Beech, and a team of three others. She earned more awards, honorary appointments, and special citations than any other woman in aviation history and was often referred to as the “First Lady of Aviation”.

== Early life and education ==
Beech was born as Olive Ann Mellor on September 25, 1903, in Waverly, Kansas, to Franklin Benjamin Mellor and Susannah Miller Mellor. Her father was a building contractor. At a young age, the family moved to Paola, Kansas, where she attended school. At the age of seven, she had her own bank account and was given the task of writing checks to pay the family bills at the age of eleven. In 1917, the Mellor family moved to Wichita, Kansas where she skipped high school and began attending the American Secretarial and Business College. At 18, she left Wichita to take a job at an electrical contracting firm in nearby Augusta, Kansas.

== Career ==
=== Travel Air ===
In 1925, at the age of 21, she was hired by Clyde Cessna and took a job as an office secretary and bookkeeper for the newly formed Travel Air Manufacturing Company in Wichita. After learning the business, she handled correspondence, kept the records, and conducted transactions. She was soon promoted to office manager and secretary to Walter Beech, one of the founders of Travel Air. Travel Air merged with the Curtiss-Wright Corporation in August 1929. Walter Beech assumed the presidency of Curtiss-Wright and moved to New York City. On February 24, 1930, they were married at Wichita and she moved to New York.

=== Beech Aircraft ===
In 1932, following Olive Ann's philosophy, “If you want something, you can do it,” Olive and Walter Beech established Beech Aircraft "with the goal to build the finest airplanes in the world." Walter Beech quit Curtiss-Wright and started Beech Aircraft Company in Wichita, naming himself as president, Olive Ann as secretary, Ted A. Wells as vice president of engineering, K. K. Shaul as treasurer, and investor C. G. Yankey as vice president. Olive Ann worked with the financial side of the business and played an important role in major company decisions. The first airplane the company designed and built was a biplane with negatively staggered wings which became known as the Model 17 Staggerwing. Olive Ann suggested that to help increase sales of the aircraft the company should sponsor a woman pilot flying the Staggerwing in the 1936 transcontinental Bendix Trophy Race. Beech-sponsored pilot Louise Thaden, along with Blanche Noyes as co-pilot, won the race against some of the nation's best male pilots.

In 1937, Beech Aircraft introduced the Twin Beech which was adopted for use by the U.S. Army Air Corps and was also sold all over the world.

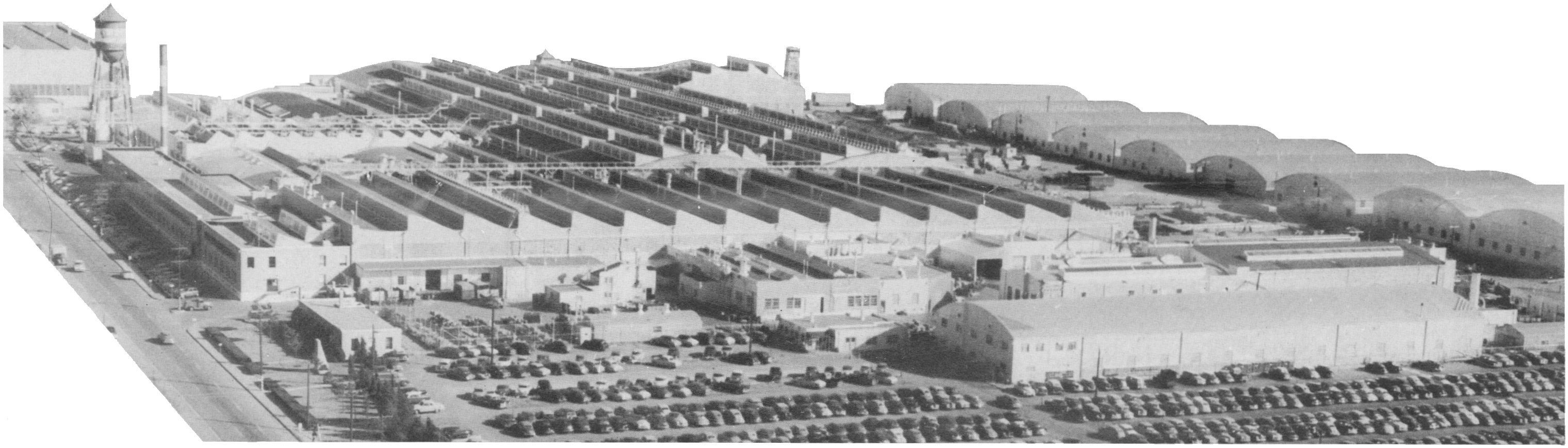
The main Beechcraft plant in Wichita, 1956

In 1940, Walter became ill with encephalitis and Olive Ann took over the leadership of the company at a time when retooling was required for military production of both the Staggerwing and the Twin Beech. She arranged for US$83,000,000 in loans for the expansion of production of both. Beech Aircraft produced more than 7,400 aircraft during World War II which were used to train navigators and bombardiers. Beech Aircraft also was awarded five Army-Navy "E" Awards during the war.

Olive Ann was kept busy with military production during the war but she also planned for the eventual end of the war. In 1946, the first aircraft to be certified for civilian production by the war production authorities was the Twin Beech. Production was also started on the Beechcraft Bonanza for the civilian market. Other airplanes introduced after the war included a military primary trainer called the T-34 Mentor which was a variant of the Bonanza and an executive type aircraft, the Beechcraft Twin Bonanza which served both civilian and military markets.

After Walter's death in November 1950, Olive Ann assumed leadership of the company by being named president and chair of the board and was the first woman to head a major aircraft company. Production of aircraft for the military during the Korean War continued and facilities were expanded. Production was diversified with the introduction of missile targets for the military.

Under Beech's leadership, the Beechcraft Travel Air was introduced in 1956 along with a way for new owners to finance their purchase through the newly formed Beechcraft Acceptance Corporation. Beech Aircraft took steps to support the United States' space exploration efforts during the late 1950s with the development of cryogenic systems for NASA. The 1960s saw the introduction of the Beechcraft Queen Air series as well as the Beechcraft Debonair, Beechcraft Baron, and Beechcraft King Air as well as the successful use of Beech Aircraft built cabin pressurization equipment used in the Gemini series of spacecraft. In response to the introduction of crosstown Wichita rival Bill Lear's successful Learjet in 1964, Olive Ann decided that Beechcraft should produce a turboprop version of the Queen Air instead of a jet. Asked by a reporter for Forbes magazine when Beechcraft would be producing a jet, Beech replied "We will, when it is compatible with our other activities." This was another example of her "Slowly We Go" policy that she had adopted after government contracts were cancelled after World War II and the Korean War. Although piston aircraft sales for Beechcraft were at record highs during the 1960s, her policy would affect the company's late entry into the jet market.

== Later life and death ==
In 1968, Olive Ann Beech announced Frank E. Hedrick, her nephew, as her successor to the presidency of Beech Aircraft while retaining the position of chair of the board and chief executive officer. In 1980, Raytheon purchased Beech Aircraft and Beech remained as chair while also being seated on the Raytheon board of directors. After the merger, Beech was the largest individual shareholder of Raytheon stock. On December 12, 1980, the U.S. National Aeronautic Association awarded her the Wright Brothers Memorial Trophy, the highest honor the aviation fraternity bestows, for her contributions to the aviation industry. The following year, she was inducted into the National Aviation Hall of Fame. Due to lackluster sales in the aircraft industry, in 1982 Raytheon reorganized several divisions and removed Beech and Hedrick from the board of directors of Beechcraft and gave her the title of chairman emeritus. Beech wasn't surprised by the move and remarked, "Mr. Hedrick, we sold the farm. If they don't like us living on it, that is their prerogative." She was inducted into the American National Business Hall of Fame in 1983 and became the first contemporary inductee in the Kansas Business Hall of Fame in 1986.

After retirement from Beechcraft, Beech continued to oversee her personal investments and contribute to various civic and philanthropic projects and was a key supporter of the Wichita Art Association, her church, and Soroptimist International of Wichita.

Beech died in her sleep at her home in Eastborough, Kansas on July 6, 1993. Olive and her husband are buried at Old Mission Mausoleum in Wichita, Kansas.

=== Legacy ===
In 1973, Beech was inducted into the National Aviation Hall of Fame.

In 1974, Beech received the Elder Statesman Award from the National Aeronautical Association (now named the McDonald Distinguished Statesman & Stateswoman of Aviation Award).

In 1994, Beech was inducted into the Women in Aviation International Pioneer Hall of Fame.

In 1995, Beech was inducted into the International Air & Space Hall of Fame at the San Diego Air & Space Museum.

In 2013, Beech was listed, along with her husband Walter, as one of Flying Magazine's 51 Heroes of Aviation, ranking at number 31.

In 2023, Beech was inducted, along with her husband Walter, into the Paul E Garber First Flight Shrine in Kill Devil Hills, NC.

== References used ==
- "51 Heroes of Aviation". Flying Magazine. Bonnier Corp.
- "1980–Olive Ann Beech". Wright Brothers Memorial 1980–1989 Recipients. National Aeronautic Association. Archived from the original on October 6, 2014.
- "Olive Beech". List of Enshrinees. National Aviation Hall of Fame. Archived from the original on May 12, 2012.
- "Travel Air to Merge With Curtiss-Wright". Lawrence (Kansas) Journal-World. August 7, 1929.
- Farney, Dennis (2010). The Barnstormer and the Lady. Kansas City, Missouri: Rockhill Books. ISBN 978-1-935362-69-2.
- Hess, Susan. "Olive Ann and Walter H. Beech: Partners in Aviation". Special Collections and University Archives. Wichita State University.
- Lambert, Bruce (July 7, 1993). "Olive A. Beech, 89, Retired Head of Beech Aircraft". The New York Times.
