= Joan Sullivan Garrett =

American business executive

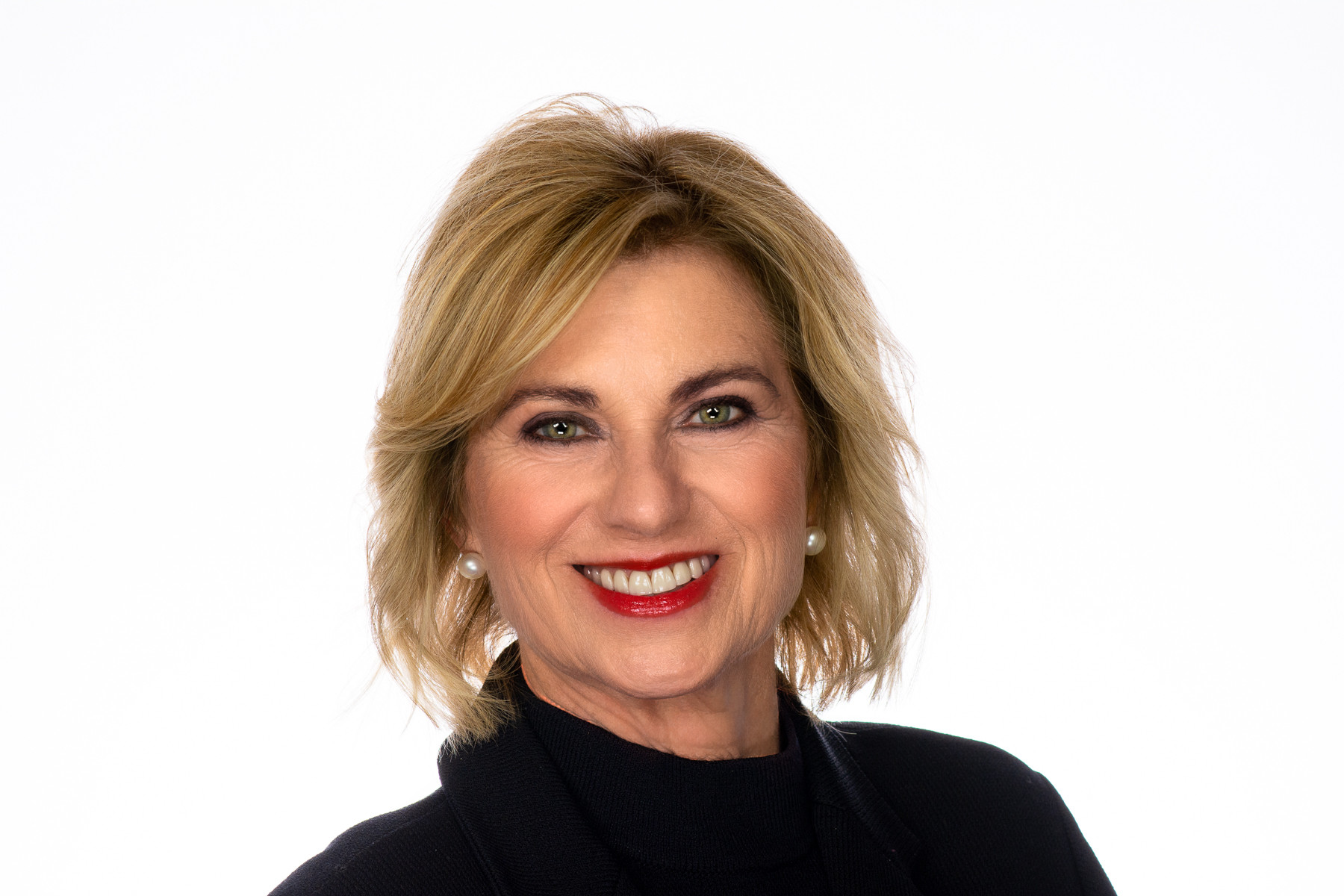
- Born: August 2, 1949 (age 77); San Francisco, California, U.S.
- Education: Mesa Community College
- Known for: Founder of MedAire, Inc.
- Spouse: Franklin Garrett (m. 1987)

Joan Sullivan Garrett (born August 2, 1949) is a former critical care flight nurse, and American business executive who founded MedAire, Inc. in 1985 and its service arm, MedLink, in 1987. She served as MedAire CEO until 2008 and today is chairman.

== Early life and education ==
Joan Sullivan Garrett was born in San Francisco, California on August 2, 1949, into a family of nurses. She attended Mesa Community College in Mesa, Arizona, where she earned an associate degree and her license as a registered nurse in her early thirties. She has been certified in advanced cardiac life support (ACLS) and pediatric advanced life support (PALS).

== Flight nursing career ==
Sullivan Garrett became a flight nurse with Air Evac, an air ambulance company at Banner Health, a trauma center then known as Samaritan Hospital System in Phoenix, Arizona, served as Director of Flight Personnel, and founded a paramedic training program.

In 1984 during a rescue and evacuation mission, Sullivan Garrett was unable to save an eight-year-old patient. The boy's death inspired Sullivan Garrett to find a way to improve the outcomes of remote medical emergencies. In 1985, she launched her startup, MedAire.

=== Founder, CEO, and Chairman of MedAire ===
As MedAire's founder and chief executive officer (CEO), Sullivan Garrett first provided a new and improved version of medical kits to the aviation and maritime industries. She responded to a Notice of Proposed Rulemaking by the Federal Aviation Administration (FAA) in 1985 with a design for a proper medical kit and trained crews in first aid response. In 1987, she developed a global remote emergency response center, MedLink, the service arm of MedAire.

In 1997, Sullivan Garrett testified before Congress regarding the need for enhanced emergency medical kits aboard U.S. airlines. MedAire received the American Telemedicine Association's Innovation Award during the Association's annual meeting, held in Tampa, Florida, also in 2004.

Sullivan Garrett stepped down as MedAire CEO in 2008 after the company was acquired by International SOS, and now serves as MedAire chairman, industry consultant, and speaker.

== Awards ==
Sullivan Garrett was recognized during Women's History Month in May 2021 by the National Aviation Hall of Fame and Boom Technology as one of six barrier-breaking women in aviation, including Bessie Coleman, Harriet Quimby, Louise Thaden, Jacqueline Cochran, and Patty Wagstaff.

- 2020 - inducted into the National Aviation Hall of Fame
- 2019 - inducted into International Air & Space Hall of Fame
- 2017 - NBAA Meritorious Service to Aviation Award
- 2017 - International Aviation Women's Association Woman of Excellence Award
- 2017 - inducted into the Hall of Fame at Mesa Community College
- 2005 - Arizona State University Spirit of Enterprise Award
- 2001 - Ernst & Young Entrepreneur of the Year Award
- 1997 - Flight Safety Foundation Business Aviation Meritorious Service Award
