= Tolling (law) =

Delay of the running of the period of time set forth by a statute of limitations

Tolling is a legal doctrine that allows for the pausing or delaying of the running of the period of time set forth by a statute of limitations, such that a lawsuit may potentially be filed even after the statute of limitations has run. Although grounds for tolling the statute of limitations vary by jurisdiction, common grounds include:

- The plaintiff was a minor at the time a cause of action accrued.
- The plaintiff has been deemed mentally incompetent.
- The plaintiff has been convicted of a felony and is imprisoned.
- The defendant has filed a bankruptcy case triggering a stay of other lawsuits.
- The defendant is not physically within a certain jurisdiction (for example, a state or country).
- The parties were engaged in good-faith negotiations to resolve a dispute without litigation when the statute of limitations expired.

Tolling may occur under a statute that specifically provides for the tolling of the statute of limitations during specified circumstances. It may also take the form of equitable tolling, where the court applies common law principles of equity to extend the time for the filing of a document.

== Statutory tolling ==
When passing statutes of limitation, legislatures may pass laws that describe when the limitations period may be extended. The effects of tolling can be curtailed by a statute of repose, a law that creates an absolute deadline for filing an action, irrespective of reasons for tolling the statute of limitations. Many jurisdictions have particular peculiarities with regard to tolling. For example, in the Commonwealth of Virginia, where a party brings an action, and then declares a nonsuit, the statute of limitations is extended for six months.

== Equitable tolling ==
Equitable tolling applies in criminal and civil proceedings, including in removal proceedings under the Immigration and Nationality Act (INA). Equitable tolling is a common principle of law stating that a statute of limitations shall not bar a claim in cases where the plaintiff, despite use of due diligence, could not or did not discover the injury until after the expiration of the limitations period.

For example, when pursuing one of several legal remedies, the statute of limitations on the remedies not being pursued will be equitably tolled if the plaintiff can show:

- Timely notice to the adverse party is given within applicable statute of limitations of filing first claim
- Lack of prejudice to the defendant
- Reasonable good faith conduct on part of the plaintiff.

It has been held that equitable tolling applies principally if the plaintiff is actively misled by the defendant about the cause of action or is prevented in some extraordinary way from asserting his or her rights. Importantly, it has also been held that the equitable tolling doctrine does not require wrongful conduct on the part of the defendant, such as fraud or misrepresentation.

=== England and Wales ===
The term tolling is unknown to English law. Part II of the Limitation Act 1980 may permit an extension or delay to commencement of a limitation period where a party operates under a defined disability, in personal injury cases, amongst others. Also, where relevant facts of a cause of action for fraud or mistake have been hidden from a claimant, the limitation period will commence on the date that the person could have with reasonable diligence discovered it.

=== United States ===
==== Federal courts ====
Historically, the federal judiciary of the United States had "allowed equitable tolling in situations where the claimant has actively pursued his judicial remedies by filing a defective pleading during the statutory period, or where the complainant has been induced or tricked by his adversary's misconduct into allowing the filing deadline to pass." The federal approach has been described as merging principles of equitable tolling and equitable estoppel. Under standard application of those principles, equitable tolling does not require any misconduct by the defendant, while equitable estoppel requires wrongful conduct on the part of the defendant, such as fraud or misrepresentation.

Before 2015, when the United States was a defendant, equitable tolling could not be applied against the United States since the Spending Clause has been interpreted by the Supreme Court to only vest Congress with the authority to waive sovereign immunity, and statutes of limitation are interpreted as a condition on the waiver of sovereign immunity that limit the jurisdiction of a court to hear cases against the United States. In April 2015, the Supreme Court ruled that equitable tolling applies against the United States, despite the Spending Clause.

==== Non-federal courts ====
Some non-federal courts in the United States take different approaches to equitable tolling, with some courts accepting equitable tolling and others sharply limiting the practice or declining to toll the statute of limitations in the absence of statutory authority.

===== Arizona =====
Arizona courts have recognized and applied the equitable tolling doctrine. For example, the state's courts have allowed equitable tolling:

- When a second wrongful death claim was not filed in a timely manner after a successful verdict on first claim that was overturned on appeal due to defective service of process.
- Where a plaintiff prisoner failed to timely file notice of claim against state because he first pursued claim through prison's administrative grievance procedure.
- When a right-to-sue letter from the Arizona Attorney General's office contained incorrect date by which plaintiff was required to sue on his claim.

===== California =====
The Supreme Court of California has held that equitable tolling may occur in carefully considered situations, as necessary to prevent the unjust technical forfeiture of causes of action, where the defendant would suffer no prejudice.

===== Delaware =====
In the context of a case in which the defendants were subject to service by substituted service, Delaware's Supreme Court held that it would not equitably toll the statute of limitations due to the plaintiff's difficulty effecting personal service of a lawsuit upon the defendants.

===== Florida =====
The Florida Supreme court observed, as an equitable remedy, the prejudice to the defendant must be considered before application of equitable tolling. The court expressed that tolling doctrine is used in the interests of justice to accommodate both a defendant's right not to be called upon to defend a stale claim and a plaintiff's right to assert a meritorious claim when equitable circumstances have prevented a timely filing. The application of equitable tolling focuses on the plaintiff's excusable ignorance of the limitations period and on the lack of prejudice to the defendant. Equitable tolling does not require active deception or employer misconduct, but focuses rather on whether the plaintiff acted with a reasonably prudent regard for his rights.

===== Maryland =====
Maryland does not permit the equitable tolling the statute of limitations, and tolls the limitations period only when the legislature has created an exception to its application. Maryland's courts have held that the statute of limitations reflects a legislative judgment of what is deemed an adequate period of time in which "a person of ordinary diligence” should bring his or her legal action.

===== Michigan =====
In Michigan, the plaintiff must exercise due diligence in order to invoke equitable tolling. Where information is reasonably available to the plaintiff such that the proper defendant may be identified and served, the plaintiff may not seek the tolling of the statute of limitations due to its failure to obtain the needed information in a timely manner.

===== Mississippi =====
Mississippi courts require earnest efforts by plaintiffs seeking tolling, and will not equitably toll the statute of limitations based upon claims of excusable neglect, or based upon the plaintiff's own actions or omissions.

===== New Mexico =====
The Supreme Court of New Mexico has held that equitable tolling normally applies in cases where a litigant was prevented from filing suit because of an extraordinary event beyond his or her control. In contrast, where a plaintiff fails to identify a cause of action and file a lawsuit in a timely manner due to his or her own fault, equitable tolling does not apply.

===== North Dakota =====
In North Dakota, a plaintiff's failure to timely serve the defendants does not warrant equitable tolling.

== Contract law ==
In certain professional sports leagues, such as in the National Hockey League, the tolling of a player's contract to allow for the pausing or delaying of the commencement of a contract can occur under certain conditions when a player signs his first NHL contract. This tolling is defined as an "entry-level slide", which can occur for a maximum of two seasons. This is demonstrated in Exhibit 16.4 of the current NHL collective bargaining agreement.

In addition, a player's contract can be tolled if a player does not satisfy his end of the playing contract (i.e., refuses to report while his contract is in force).

For the American broadcasting licensing authority, the Federal Communications Commission, the term tolling is used to describe an allowed delay in the activation of broadcast facilities past the expiration date of a construction permit, due to factors such as the inability to build them out due to a lack of available contractors and engineers, financial hardship for the licensee, or natural disasters and other acts of God.
