= Thornton Wilson =

American aviation executive (1921–1999)

Thornton A. Wilson
- Born: Thornton Arnold Wilson; February 8, 1921; Sikeston, Missouri, U.S.
- Died: April 10, 1999 (aged 78); Palm Springs, California, U.S.
- Education: Iowa State University (BS); California Institute of Technology (MS)
- Occupations: Former CEO, Boeing
- Term: 1969–1986
- Predecessor: William McPherson Allen
- Successor: Frank Shrontz
- Spouse: Grace Wilson
- Children: Dan Wilson, Sachi Wilson, Sarah Parkinson

Thornton "T" Arnold Wilson (February 8, 1921 – April 10, 1999) was the Chairman of the Board and chief executive officer of Boeing corporation.

Born February 8, 1921, in Sikeston, Missouri, Wilson earned his B.S. degree in Aeronautical Engineering from Iowa State University in Ames and a M.S. degree from the California Institute of Technology in Pasadena. He also attended the MIT Sloan School of Management's Sloan Fellows program, but did not graduate. While attending Iowa State, Wilson was a member of the swim team.

Wilson was awarded the NAS Award in Aeronautical Engineering in 1985 from the National Academy of Sciences. In 1992, he was the recipient of the Tony Jannus Award for his distinguished contributions to commercial aviation.

Following his graduation from Iowa State, Wilson joined Boeing in 1943 and worked on bomber programs, notably the swept-wing B-47 Stratojet and B-52 Stratofortress, and also led the proposal team that won the contract for the Minuteman missile. He became company president in 1968, chief executive officer in 1969, and chairman in 1972. Wilson stepped down as CEO in 1986 at age 65, succeeded by Frank Shrontz, and retired as chairman at the end of 1987. He died at age 78 at his winter home in Palm Springs, California.

The main glass gallery of the Museum of Flight in Seattle, opened in 1987, is named for Wilson.

Wilson was inducted into the National Aviation Hall of Fame in Dayton, Ohio in 1983.

Business positions
Preceded by William McPherson Allen	CEO of Boeing; 1969-1986	Succeeded by Frank Shrontz
