= Frederick C. Crawford =

American industrialist and philanthropist (1891-1994)

Frederick Coolidge Crawford
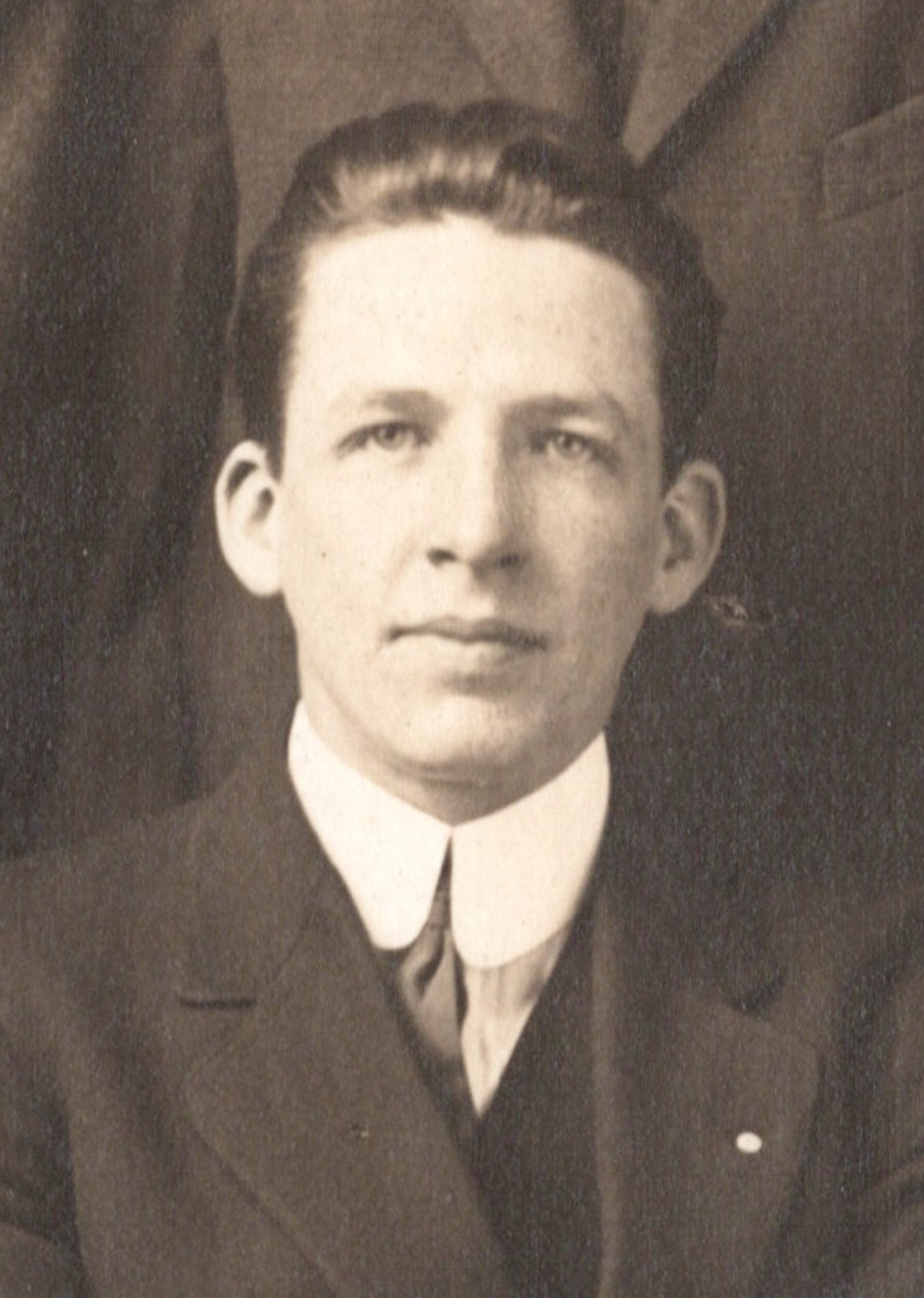
- Born: March 19, 1891; Watertown, Massachusetts, U.S.
- Died: December 9, 1994 (aged 103); Falmouth, Massachusetts, U.S.
- Education: Harvard College A.B.; Harvard University M.E. (1916)
- Awards: American National Business Hall of Fame; Automotive Hall of Fame; Golden Plate Award; National Aviation Hall of Fame; Vermilye Medal

Frederick Coolidge Crawford (March 19, 1891 – December 9, 1994) was an American industrialist and philanthropist. He was also the president of Thompson Products, Inc. (which later became part of TRW) and a major promoter of the National Air Races in Cleveland.

Crawford was born March 19, 1891, in Watertown, Massachusetts, and went to Harvard College, graduating magna cum laude with a Bachelor of Arts degree. In 1916, he earned a master of engineering. Soon after he moved to Cleveland, Ohio, where he worked as a millwright's assistant. During World War II, Thompson Products and Crawford manufactured auto and aviation components critical to the allied war effort. In 1957, he was awarded the Franklin Institute's Vermilye Medal. In 1972, Crawford received the Golden Plate Award of the American Academy of Achievement. In 1993, he was inducted into the National Aviation Hall of Fame. He had previously been elected to the Business Hall of Fame and the Automotive Hall of Fame.

He was recognized worldwide for his leadership in the automotive and aviation industries, as a pioneer in the human relations field (who kept management–labor strife to a minimum at Thompson and TRW by providing effective channels for worker grievances and collective bargaining), and a leader in the philanthropic community in Cleveland, Ohio. Crawford denounced United Auto Workers labor leader Walter Reuther as "a socialist at heart ... (who) can see no place for the stockholder in American industry, and is a ruthless, ambitious, unprincipled labor leader... ."

As head of Thompson Products for more than 25 years, Crawford oversaw the company's transformation from an automotive and aircraft parts manufacturer to a leader in the aviation and aerospace industries.

For many years, Crawford collected antique automobiles. His original motivation was simply that he saw historical value in saving certain early examples that, before the 1950s, were generally not valued by anyone except at their scrap value. The collection became known as the "Auto Album". The collection was housed by TRW before being donated to the Crawford Auto-Aviation Museum of the Western Reserve Historical Society.

Crawford was a trustee of Case Institute of Technology, now Case Western Reserve University, where Crawford Hall was named in his honor.

== Selected bibliography ==
- Crawford, Frederick C. and Colket, Jr., Meredith. (1973). The Architecture of Cleveland: Twelve Buildings, 1836–1912. Western Reserve Historical Society, Cleveland, Ohio.
- Johnston, Christopher, Ed. (1992). Storyettes: Reminiscences of Frederick Coolidge Crawford. The Press at Cropthorne, Cleveland, Ohio. ISBN 0944125190
- Crawford, Frederick C. and Johnston, Christopher. (1993). Selected Speeches of Frederick Coolidge Crawford. Privately printed, Cleveland, Ohio.
- Johnston, Christopher, Ed. (1994). Storyettes: Reminiscences of Frederick Coolidge Crawford, Volume II. The Stinehour Press, Lunenburg, Vermont.
