= General Aviation Manufacturers Association =

The General Aviation Manufacturers Association (GAMA) is the industry trade association representing general aviation (non-military & non-airliner) aircraft manufacturers and related enterprises, chiefly in the United States. It is headquartered in Washington, D.C., with an office in Brussels, Belgium.

== History ==
Light aircraft manufacturers in the United States were typically members of the Aerospace Industries Association (originally called the Aeronautical Chamber of Commerce), which represented all aircraft manufacturers in the U.S. catering to military aviation, commercial aviation and general aviation.

Increasing division of interests and priorities, and the disproportionate power of the military and commercial aircraft manufacturers, led to the establishment of a new organization to represent general aviation aircraft manufacturers. The organization was established as the Utility Aircraft Council, until its director died suddenly. That organization's public relations man, Ed Stimpson, took the reins and evolved the organization into GAMA in 1970.

Initially, GAMA represented general aviation fixed-wing aircraft (not helicopter) manufacturers in the United States only. It has since grown to embrace aircraft manufacturers in other countries, with an additional office in Brussels, Belgium. In 2011, GAMA members voted to open GAMA membership to helicopter manufacturers as well.

GAMA has also expanded its membership to include producers of general aviation engines, avionics, spare parts and related services. The organization claims to represent over 80 manufacturers.

== Issues and outcomes ==
GAMA serves as a:

- Political lobbying group, representing the interests of the manufacturers of general aviation aircraft and products to governments
- Industry data and information clearinghouse, public relations and reporting service (particularly publishing quarterly aircraft production data and the annual GAMA Statistical Yearbook and Industry Outlook, which typically contains an annualized summary of the quarterly reports, over several years, with additional general aviation statistics, and analysis)
- Industry partnering organization, providing for joint efforts by general aviation manufacturers towards shared goals (among these, various industry promotions, training, scholarships and awards programs)

Among the issues dealt with by GAMA have been:

- Encouraging people to become lightplane pilots
- Lobbying for manufacturing and safety standards suiting the GAMA members
- Establishment of the Airport and Airway Trust Fund
- Allocation of aviation fuel during the Arab oil embargo of the mid-1970s
- Dealing with the impact of the PATCO strike by the Professional Air Traffic Controllers Organization that crippled U.S. aviation in the 1980s
- Leading the (eventually successful) effort to pass the General Aviation Revitalization Act, which shields manufacturers of light aircraft from lawsuits over crashes of small aircraft that are 18 years old or older (This act, passed in 1994 after several years of GAMA lobbying, is credited with reviving the small aircraft industry, which had been hard hit by a rapidly rising tide of crash-lawsuits)
- Corporate risk managers' opposition to corporate aviation
- Shortages of aviation fuel for piston-powered aircraft
- Government attempts to tax general aviation through "user fees"
- The shift of general aviation away from mass-market, piston-powered light aircraft to narrow-market, high-priced business jets and turboprops

== Members ==
Current member organizations are:

=== Aircraft manufacturers ===
- Air Tractor, Inc.
- Airbus Helicopters
- Beechcraft
- Bell Helicopter
- Boeing Business Jets
- Bombardier Aerospace
- Cessna Aircraft Company
- Cirrus Aircraft
- CubCrafters, Inc.
- DAHER-SOCATA
- Dassault Falcon
- Diamond Aircraft Industries
- Eclipse Aerospace
- Embraer
- Flight Design GmbH
- Gulfstream Aerospace Corporation
- Mooney International Corporation
- Nextant Aerospace, LLC
- Piaggio Aero Industries S.p.A.
- Pilatus Aircraft, Ltd.
- Piper Aircraft, Inc.
- Quest Aircraft Company
- Sabreliner Corporation
- Thrush Aircraft Inc.
- Universal Hydrogen Co.

=== Engine manufacturers ===
- Continental Aerospace Technologies
- GE Aviation
- GE Honda Aero Engines, LLC
- Honeywell - Business & General Aviation
- Lycoming Engines
- Pratt & Whitney Canada
- Rolls-Royce
- SMA
- Williams International

=== Avionics manufacturers ===
- Aero-Mach Labs
- Appareo
- Aspen Avionics
- Avidyne Corporation
- Cobham Avionics, Integrated Systems
- Dynon, Inc.
- Esterline CMC Electronics
- FreeFlight Systems
- Garmin International Inc.
- Innovative Solutions & Support, Inc.
- L-3 Communications - Products Group
- Collins Aerospace
- Safe Flight Instrument Corporation
- Sandel Avionics, Inc.
- Thales Canada Inc.
- Universal Avionics Systems Corp.

=== Component manufacturers and service providers ===
- ATP
- Avfuel Corporation
- Aviall, Inc
- B/E Aerospace, Inc.
- BBA Aviation
- Blackhawk Modifications, Inc.
- Bosch General Aviation Technology GmbH
- BRS Aerospace
- CAE SimuFlite
- CAV Aerospace, Inc.
- Duncan Aviation
- Extant Components Group
- FlightSafety International, Inc.
- ForeFlight, LLC
- General Aviation Modifications, Inc
- GKN Aerospace Transparency Systems Inc.
- Greenwich AeroGroup
- Hartzell Propeller, Inc.
- ICE Corporation
- International Communications Group (ICG)
- Jeppesen
- Jet Aviation
- Jet Support Services, Inc.
- Kaman Corporation
- Meggitt Safety Systems Inc.
- Meggitt Sensing Systems
- NORDAM
- Parker Aerospace
- PATS Aircraft Systems
- PPG Aerospace
- Redbird Flight Simulations, Inc.
- SimCom International
- StandardAero
- Stevens Aviation
- Taylor-Deal Aviation LLC
- Teton Aviation Group, LLC
- Triumph Group, Inc.
- UTC Aerospace Systems
- Wipaire, Inc.
- Woodward, Inc.

== Leadership and key people ==
Ed Stimpson (died 2009) headed GAMA for 25 years as its first president and shaped the identity and role of the organization.

Drew Steketee served as communications director from 1980 to 1987.

Pete Bunce is the current president and CEO since 2005.

== See also ==
- General aviation in Europe
- General aviation in the United Kingdom
