= Statute of repose =

Cuts off certain legal rights if not acted on by a specified deadline

A statute of repose (sometimes called a nonclaim statute), like a statute of limitations, is a statute that cuts off certain legal rights if they are not acted on by a specified deadline.

Statutes of repose exist in a number of contexts. Some jurisdictions have passed statutes of repose in the context of products liability law, or for probate court proceedings.

== Difference from a statute of limitations ==
A statute of repose is distinct from a statute of limitations, though their effects are very similar. Deadlines imposed by a statute of repose are enforced much more strictly than those of a statute of limitations. In contrast to a statute of limitations, a statute of repose "is designed to bar actions after a specified period of time has run from the occurrence of some event other than the injury which gave rise to the claim."

- A statute of limitations focuses on requiring timeliness of action from an injured party, and thus may potentially be extended where a delay in commencing a legal action is not the injured party's fault. The operation of a statute of limitations can be avoided or tolled by a number of equitable factors, such as the minority of the injured party, or attempts by a tortfeasor to conceal evidence of responsibility. Some statutes of limitations begin to run only when the injured party discovers or reasonably should have discovered the injury.
- A statute of repose focuses on immunizing the alleged injuring party from long-term liability, and thus may even be based on elapsed time from an event, even if the potential cause of action cannot reasonably be discovered until a later date.

In simple terms, a statute of limitations may start to run at a date other than when a wrongful act or omission allegedly occurred, or may be extended based upon factors that delay the reasonable discovery of an injury or the plaintiff's ability to take action, while a statute of repose is triggered by the completion of an act and is not ordinarily subject to extension or exception. For example, many U.S. states have laws that provide that when a construction project is "substantially completed," meaning that just those items on a "punch list" remain, a statute of repose starts to run for claims relating to defective design or construction.

Although a statute of limitations and a statute of repose are different, the two concepts are sometimes confused, even by legislatures in their enactment of statutes. In a U.S. court case that reached the nation's Supreme Court, the court took note of the failure of Congress to consistently observe the distinction when drafting laws:

While the term "statute of limitations" has acquired a precise meaning, distinct from "statute of repose," and while that is its primary meaning, it must be acknowledged that the term "statute of limitations" is sometimes used in a less formal way. In that sense, it can refer to any provision restricting the time in which a plaintiff must bring suit. ... Congress has used the term "statute of limitations" when enacting statutes of repose. See, e.g., 15 U.S.C. § 78u-6(h)(1)(B)(iii)(I)(aa) (2012 ed.) (creating a statute of repose and placing it in a provision entitled "Statute of limitations"); 42 U.S.C. § 2278 (same). And petitioner does not point out an example in which Congress has used the term "statute of repose." So the Court must proceed to examine other evidence of the meaning of the term "statute of limitations" as it is used in § 9658.

In many cases, both a statute of limitations and a statute of repose will apply to the same case, and a statute of repose may cut off liability even if the statute of limitations has not run. For example, a defect in an airplane might cause a crash twelve years after the date of initial sale, with the statute of limitations for a personal injury claim commencing on the date of the crash, but where a ten-year statute of repose on product liability claims will have already expired. The earlier expiration of the statute of repose will prevent the personal injury claim even before the statute of limitations starts to run.

== In product liability ==
Product liability involves the potential liability of manufacturers, distributors and retailers for injuries that result from dangerous or defective products. For example, a statute of repose may bar an action from being commenced after a specific number of years from the date when the product was initially delivered.

A product liability statute of repose may bar a remedy even before a cause of action arises. For example, if a defective product first sold to a consumer more than ten years ago causes an injury, a ten-year statute of repose (that starts on the product's original date of purchase) might bar a claim even if the statute of limitations (which starts on the date of injury) does not.

Because statutes of repose impose an absolute bar for actions against manufacturers, typically based on the date that allegedly defective goods are delivered or installed rather than the date when they cause harm, they are strongly favored over a statute of limitations by industry trade groups and opposed by consumer organizations and tort lawyers. In the United States, statutes of repose are a part of legislative proposals for "tort reform".

== In estate administration ==
Many jurisdictions have statutes of repose that relate to the administration of decedents' estates. For example, legislatures often set deadlines for actions such as will contests, or for the submission of claims by creditors that the estate owes them money. If such a claim is not brought within the prescribed period of time under which the claimant or creditor is authorized to act, the claim becomes barred by statutes of repose.

Under a typical statute of repose, creditors of a decedent who do not act upon receiving actual or constructive notice that an estate has been opened have their claims cut off, and cannot disturb the peaceful possession of the distributed assets by the heirs. These probate statutes are less controversial than statutes of repose in injury and product liability cases, as public policy favors the distribution of estates to the heirs with all deliberate speed, and weighs against reopening estates trying to recover money from the heirs to whom it has already been distributed.
