= Flying the Feathered Edge: The Bob Hoover Project =

Flying the Feathered Edge
- Film poster
- Directed by: Kim Furst
- Produced by: Kim Furst
- Starring: Bob Hoover; Harrison Ford; Carroll Shelby; Clay Lacy; Sean Tucker; Gene Cernan; Burt and Dick Rutan; Bud Day; John R. Dailey
- Music by: David Cottrell
- Production company: Kilo Foxtrot Films
- Distributed by: Kilo Foxtrot Films
- Release date: November 27, 2014
- Running time: 86 mins
- Country: United States
- Language: English

Flying the Feathered Edge: The Bob Hoover Project is a 2014 independent documentary film about American aviator Bob Hoover. The film was produced, written and directed by aviation filmmaker Kim Furst.

== Concept ==
The title derives from the idea that Hoover spent his career flying on the "feathered edge" of the flight envelope, through his years as a United States Army Air Forces fighter pilot, test pilot, and air show performer.

Harrison Ford and Sean D. Tucker, along with Hoover himself, frame the story of the film, which includes participation from aviation figures such as Burt and Dick Rutan, Carroll Shelby, Gene Cernan, Bud Day, Clay Lacy, John R. Dailey and others, as well as archival footage of a tribute to Hoover's flying capabilities by Neil Armstrong.

Hoover expressed great satisfaction for the film.

The documentary contains footage from Hoover's personal collections, online and physical archives as well as from a variety of other sources.

== Screenings and reception ==
The first official screening of the completed film was a private showing during the 2014 EAA AirVenture Oshkosh convention, attended by then 92-year-old Hoover.

The film premiered at the Rhode Island International Film Festival, winning the "Grand Prize, Soldiers and Sacrifice Award". Other festival screenings included the Breckenridge International Film Festival ("Audience Award"), Napa Valley Film Festival ("Best Doc Competition"), Houston WorldFest ("Grand Jury Prize"), and DocUTAH.

Theatrical screenings began on August 19, 2015, coinciding with National Aviation Day.

Producer, writer and director Kim Furst was awarded the 13th Annual Combs Gates Award for the film through the National Aviation Hall of Fame, and was presented a $20,000 award on November 18 at the National Business Aviation Association (NBAA) 68th Annual Meeting & Convention in Las Vegas, Nevada.
