= Sean D. Tucker =

American aerobatic pilot (born 1952)

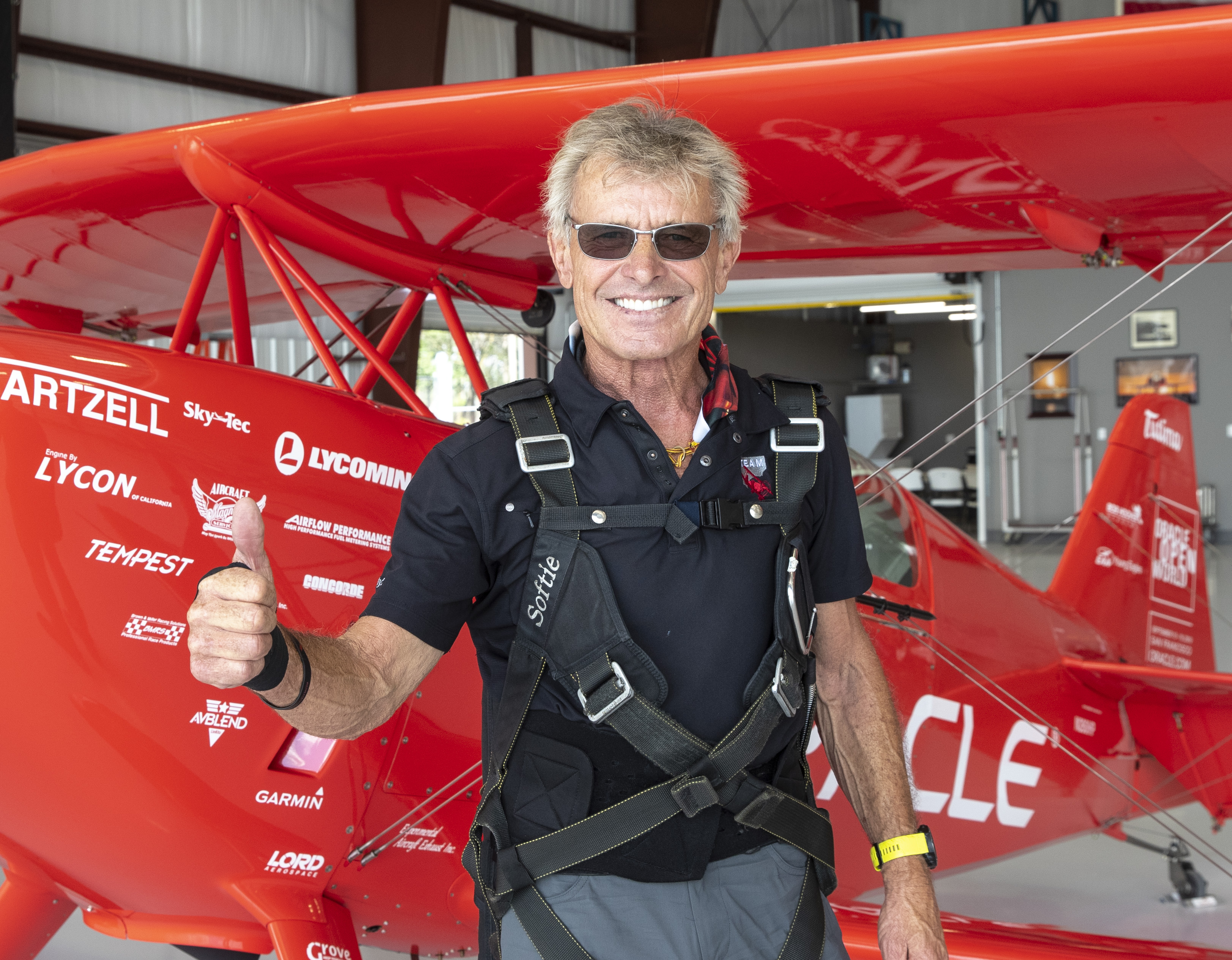
- Tucker at the 2019 Chicago Air & Water Show
- Born: April 27, 1952 (age 74); Eagle Rock, California, United States
- Occupation: Aerobatic pilot
- Years active: 1976–present
- Spouse: Colleen Tucker (m. 1977)
- Children: Eric Tucker; Tara Tucker
- Website: Tutima Academy

Sean Doherty Tucker (born April 27, 1952) is an American world champion aerobatic aviator. He was previously sponsored by the Oracle Corporation for many years, performing in air shows worldwide as "Team Oracle". Tucker has won numerous air show championship competitions throughout his career, was named one of the 25 "Living Legends of Flight" by the Smithsonian's National Air and Space Museum in 2003, and was inducted into the National Aviation Hall of Fame in 2008. He has led several efforts to assist youth in learning to fly or becoming involved in general aviation, and currently serves as co-chairman of the Experimental Aircraft Association (EAA)'s Young Eagles program, a role he has held since 2013.

== Career ==
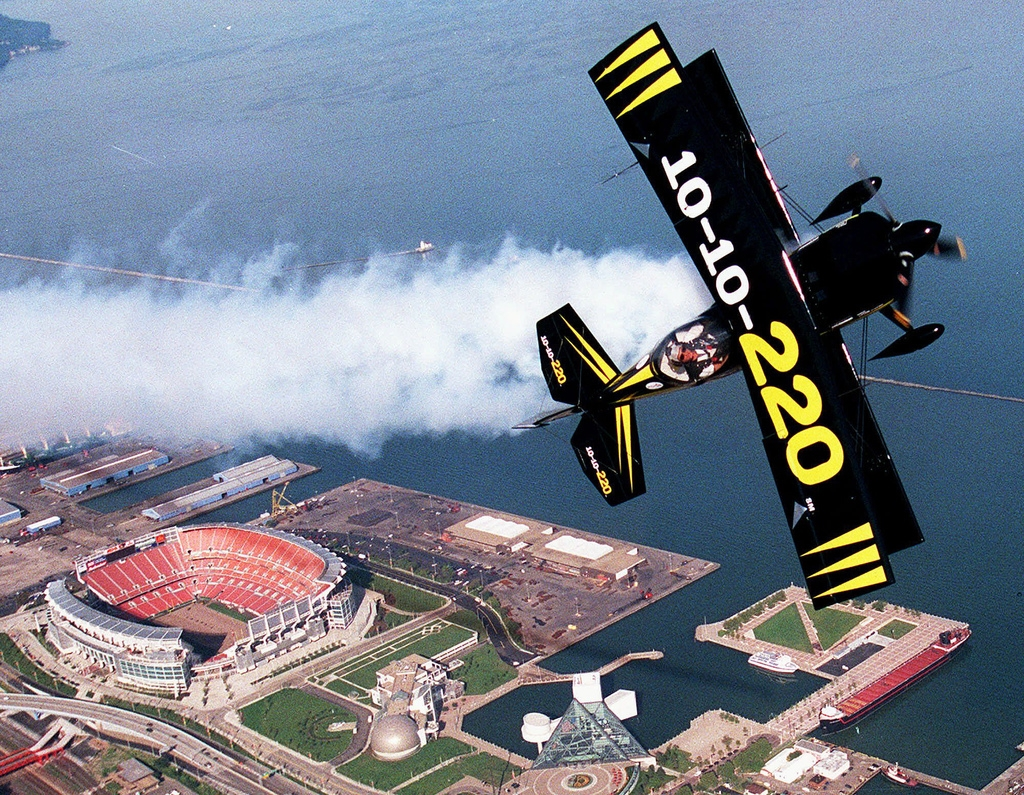
Tucker performing at the Cleveland National Air Show in 1999

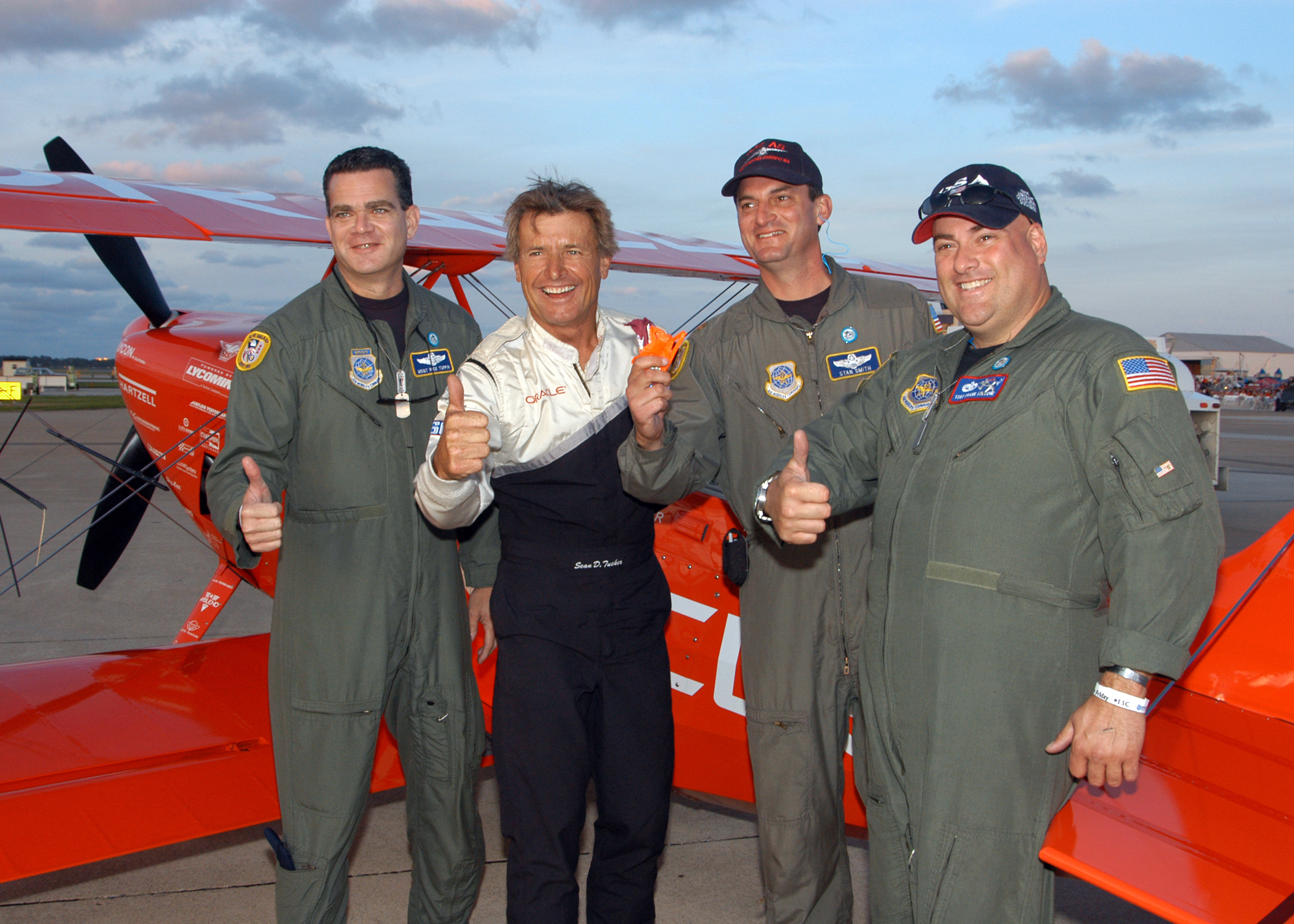
Tucker (2nd from left) in 2004 posing with the aircrew of the USAF Lockheed C-5 Galaxy

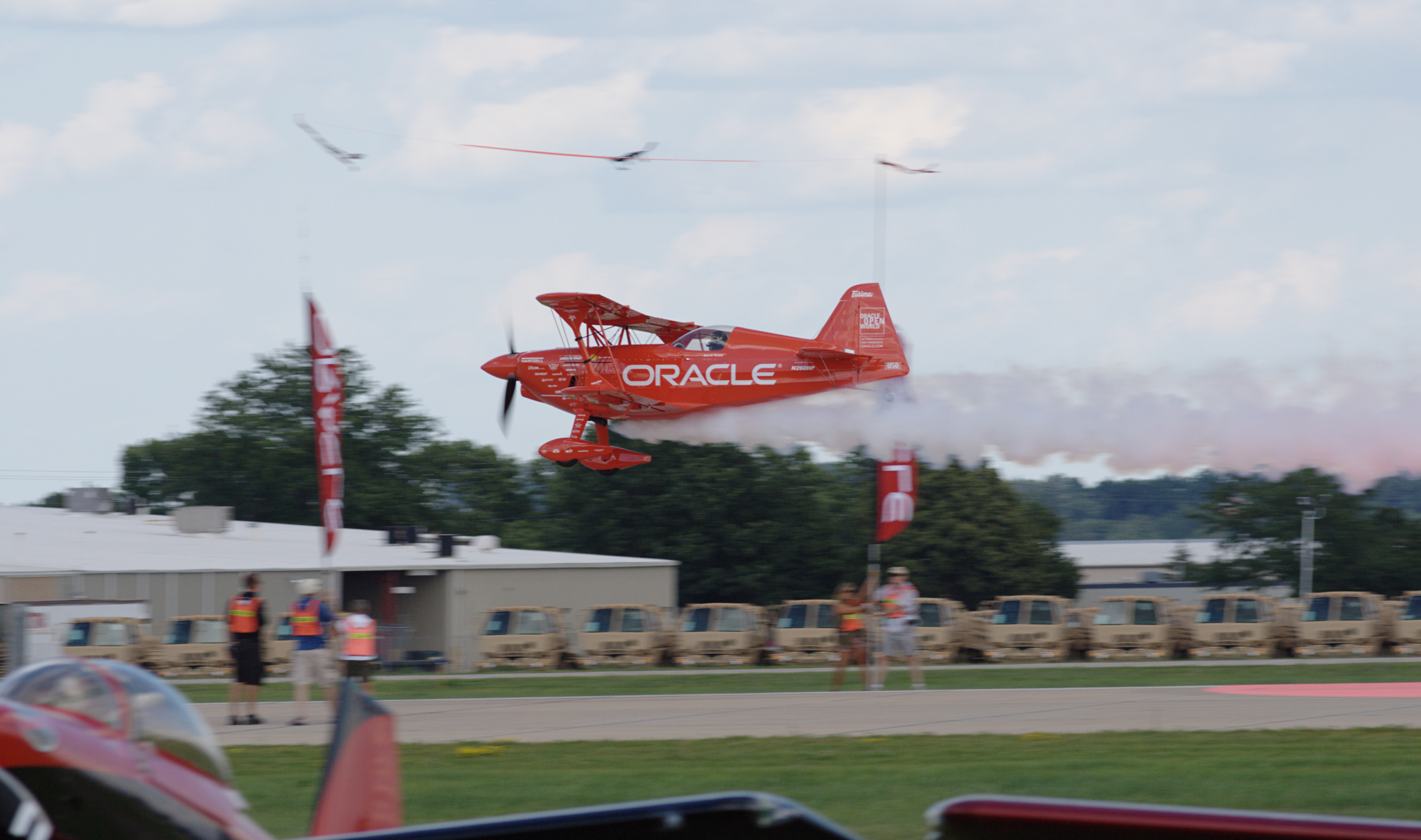
Tucker flying under ribbons at EAA AirVenture Oshkosh in 2013

Sean Tucker, a native of Eagle Rock, California, earned his Private Pilot certificate at age 17. His father, William, was an aviation industry lawyer who had learned to fly as part of his job. Tucker started out as a cropduster, eventually starting a cropdusting business in Salinas, California. In order to overcome his fear of crashing, he took an aerobatics course, through which he "found out you could roll an airplane upside down and it wouldn't fall out of the sky." He has been flying airshows worldwide since the mid-1970s and is considered by many to be one of the world's premier airshow performers. Tucker's favorite stunt is the "triple-ribbon cut", where he uses his plane to cut three ribbons suspended between poles from three different angles. Despite once having a fear of flying, Tucker has flown more than 1,000 performances at more than 425 airshows, in front of more than 80 million spectators.

Tucker's first sponsorship was with Randolph Sunglasses from 1993 through 1995, then in 1996 he transitioned to MCI under the 1-800-COLLECT and 10-10-220 brands until his start with Oracle in 2001.

Tucker has been named one of the Living Legends of Aviation, is the recipient of the Crystal Eagle Award, was an inductee at the 2001 USAF Gathering of Eagles, and in 2003 was named one of the Smithsonian National Air and Space Museum's 25 Living Legends of Flight.

To endure the extreme physical demands of his acrobatic flying routine, Tucker maintains a rigorous physical training schedule, working out more than 340 days per year in a routine of jogging and weightlifting on alternating days. His other physical activities include mountain climbing, heli-skiing, cave SCUBA diving, and golfing. When asked about flying airshows, Tucker has said, "I like to think that I bring the fans' dreams of flying into the plane with me, and there's nowhere I’d rather be than in the cockpit. That’s why I train so hard to keep a finely-tuned edge."

Tucker's self-proclaimed goal is to "share the magic of flight with Team Oracle’s guests by inspiring and thrilling them. I want them to go away saying that the airshow was one of the most-engaging days of their lives."

He is one of only a handful of civilian performers who have been allowed to fly close formation with the Blue Angels and the Thunderbirds.

In 2013, Tucker was appointed Chairman of the Experimental Aircraft Association (EAA) program Young Eagles, which introduces and educates children aged 8 to 17 about aviation. It has given flights to over 2 million children around the world. Tucker is an annual fixture at the EAA AirVenture Oshkosh airshow each summer. At the 2016 event, Tucker was joined by past EAA Young Eagles chairmen Harrison Ford, Chesley Sullenberger and Jeff Skiles as they flew the 2 millionth Young Eagle. In July 2018, NFL player Jimmy Graham became co-chairman of the program, with Tucker.

On October 21, 2018, he flew his last solo performance at the Wings Over Houston Airshow over Ellington Field in Houston, Texas. In 2019, Tucker lead an aerobatic demo team with Jessy Panzer.

On May 13, 2020, Tucker announced that he will be flying a new formation aerobatic act featuring Cristian Bolton, Bill Stein, and Jessy Panzer. The team will perform aerial demonstrations in the Game Composites GB1 GameBird.

In May 2021, the Washington Post reported that he was no longer sponsored by the Oracle Corporation, effectively ending his 20-year-long partnership with the company as "Team Oracle".

=== Tutima Academy ===
In 1997, Tucker started the Sean D. Tucker School of Aerobatic Flight, with the stated aim of setting and spreading the standard for aviation safety in aerobatics and aviation at large. In 2004, through a partnership with the Tutima Watch Company, the school became the Tutima Academy of Aviation Safety. The academy, located in King City, California, offers a variety of courses including stall/spin recognition and recovery training, aerobatic proficiency training, a low-level aerobatic mentorship program, and formation aerobatic flight training.

=== Bob Hoover Academy ===
In 2013, Tucker and his son Eric founded the nonprofit organization Every Kid Can Fly, which in 2017 led to the Bob Hoover Academy, a program that aims to create opportunities in aviation that inspire at-risk and low-income teens in the Salinas area. In partnership with the Monterey County Office of Education, teens take classes focused on core STEM principles. As they progress in the program, the students take aviation ground school and flight lessons leading to an eventual solo flight. Rather than producing professional pilots, Tucker's goal is for the teens to develop the skills and confidence necessary to improve their lives using education and the experience of flight as the motivator. The school district provides the teachers and classroom curriculum while Tucker provides the aviation resources - including a dedicated flight instructor, aircraft, fuel and hangar facilities.

The academy was named after famed aviator Bob Hoover - a World War II pilot, airshow pilot and mentor to Tucker. In 2018, both Harrison Ford and Redbird Flight Simulations donated substantial resources to the academy.

== Tucker’s airplane ==
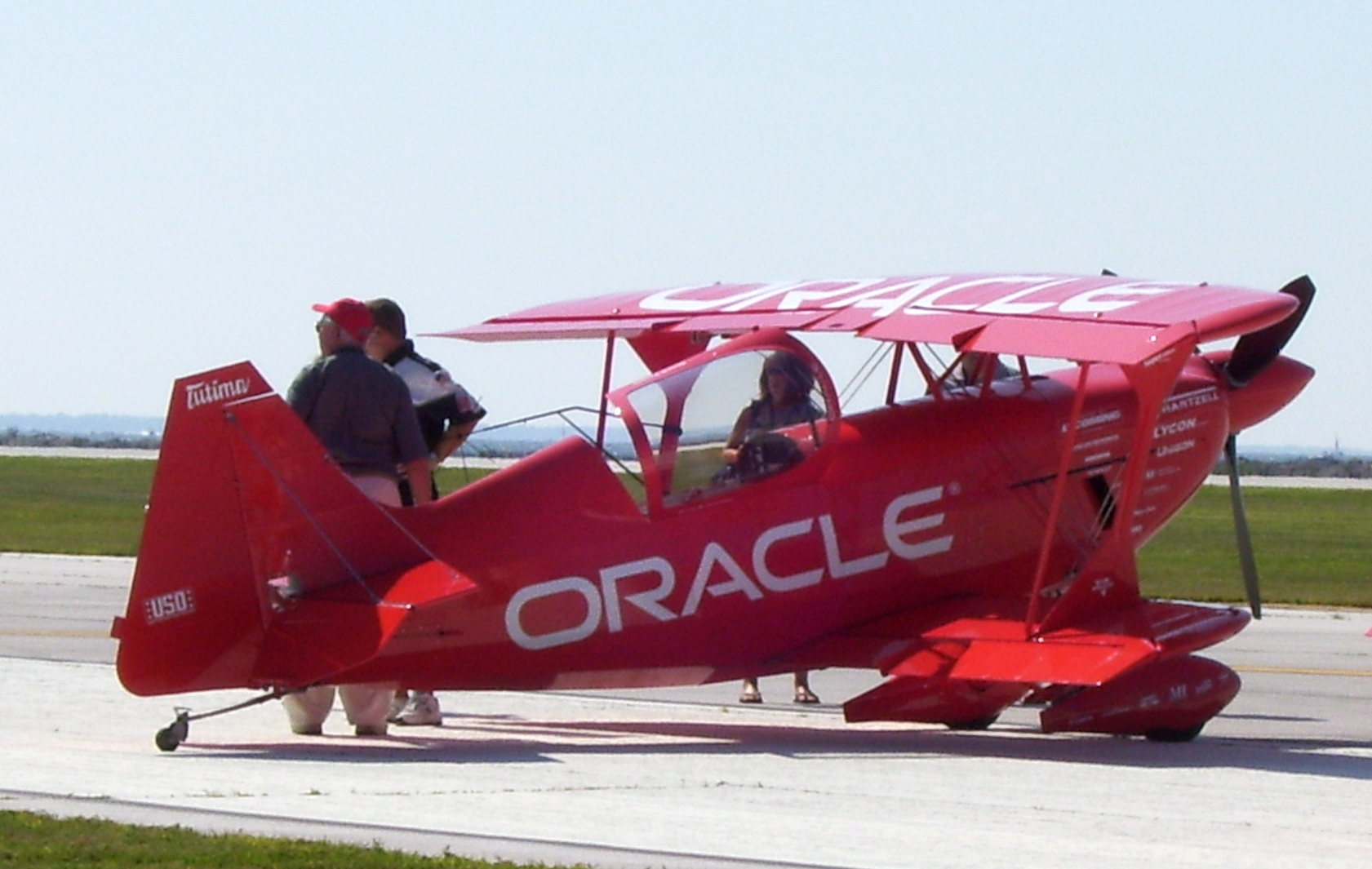
Tucker's Oracle-sponsored Challenger II biplane

Tucker's airplane, the Oracle Challenger III biplane, is claimed to produce more than 400 horsepower, and weighs only 1,200 pounds. The Challenger III is equipped with a unique set of wings that use 8 ailerons instead of 4. The tail on the airplane is modeled after the tail used on high-performance radio control airplanes.

After retiring from solo performances in 2018, he donated the Oracle Challenger III to the Smithsonian Institution’s National Air and Space Museum, where it is displayed at the entrance to the Thomas W. Haas We All Fly general aviation gallery, which opened in 2022. Film producer and pilot David Ellison, who Tucker once mentored, provided the funds necessary in order to donate the aircraft to the museum on Tucker's behalf.

== Accidents ==
Tucker's first accident occurred in 1979, when he had to parachute out of his disabled aerobatic airplane.

In 1993, as he was climbing out of the parked stunt plane he used at the time, a Pitts S-2S biplane, a runaway aircraft on the ground collided with his aircraft. Tucker escaped unscathed, but damage to the wings on one side of his aircraft took ten days to repair.

In 2006, the elevator (pitch control) system in Tucker's aerobatic aircraft broke during a practice aerobatic flight, forcing him to bail out over an empty farm field in Coushatta, Louisiana. He was uninjured, but the aircraft he was flying was destroyed.

== Popular culture ==
In 2009, Tucker was featured on The Oprah Winfrey Show. The segment featured an interview with Oprah Winfrey and a video segment where Tucker took a 29-year-old woman on an aerobatic flight to conquer her fear of flying.

In 2010, Tucker appeared in the MythBusters episode "Cold Feet", where he took host Tory Belleci through multiple stunt maneuvers in order to test if nervousness and fear actually reduces the temperature of one's foot.

In 2014, he and Harrison Ford starred in and framed Flying the Feathered Edge: The Bob Hoover Project, an independent aviation documentary detailing the life of aerobatic legend Bob Hoover.

In 2015, CNN featured Tucker in a story titled "Does this man have the most dangerous job in America?".

== Awards and recognition ==
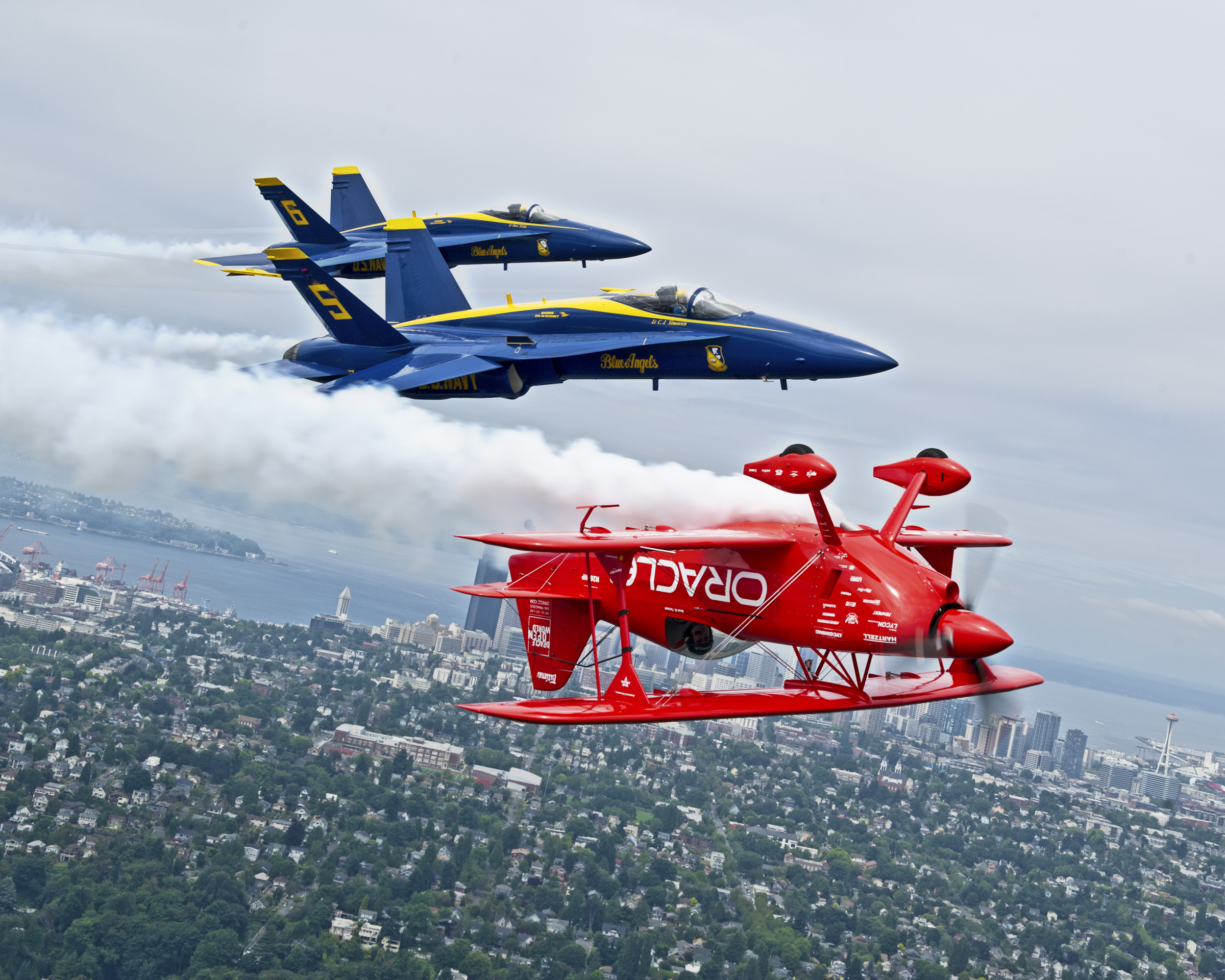
Sean Tucker flying inverted with the US Navy Blue Angels over Seattle

- Second recipient and first non-namesake recipient of the R.A. "Bob" Hoover Trophy (chosen by Hoover himself) — 2017
- Lloyd P. Nolen Lifetime Achievement in Aviation Award — 2016
- EAA AirVenture Freedom of Flight Award — 2010
- General Charles E. Yeager International Aeronautical Achievement Award — 2010
- San Diego Air & Space Museum's International Air & Space Hall of Fame — 2009
- National Aviation Hall of Fame (NAHF) — 2008
- International Council of Air Shows Foundation Hall of Fame — 2007
- Living Legends of Aviation Award — 2007
- Crystal Eagle Award by the National Aeronautics Association — 2006
- Named one of the 25 "Living Legends of Flight" by the National Air & Space Smithsonian — 2003
- Inductee in the United States Air Force Gathering of Eagles — 2001
- World Airshow Federation Champion — 2000
- International Council of Airshows Sword of Excellence — 2000
- Undefeated Champion of the Championship Airshow Pilots Association Challenge — 1998–2001
- General Aviation News and Flyer Reader's Choice Award for Best Male Performer — 1997
- The Art Scholl Memorial Showmanship Award — 1992
- The Bill Barber Award for Air Show Showmanship – 1992
- U.S. National Advanced Aerobatic Champion — 1988
- Honorary Member — United States Navy Blue Angels, United States Air Force Thunderbirds, United States Army Parachute Team ("Golden Knights"), Canadian Forces Snowbirds, and Brazilian Smoke Squadron
