= USS Carney =

Arleigh Burke-class destroyer

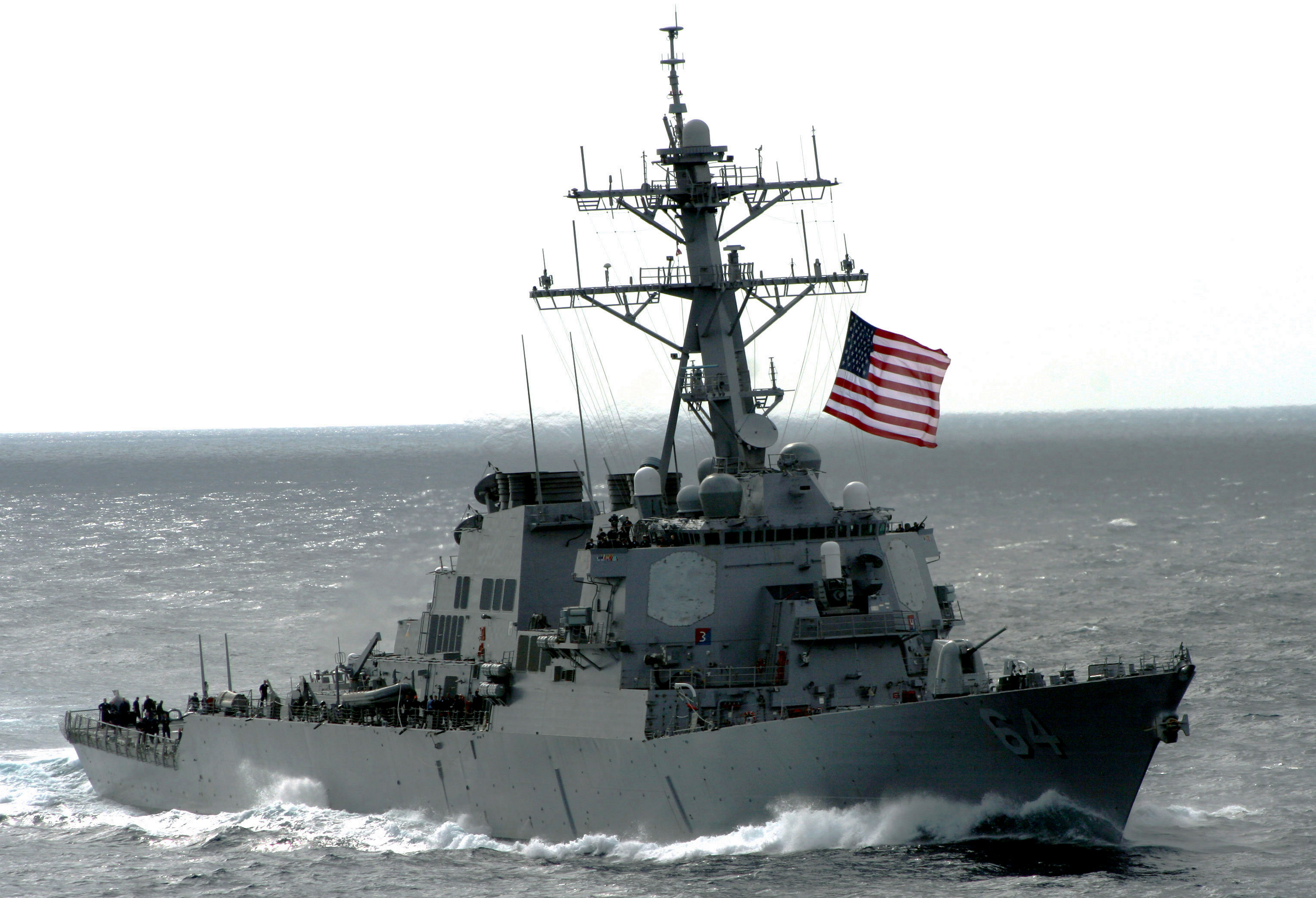
- USS Carney on 21 January 2006

History

United States
- Name: Carney
- Namesake: Robert Carney
- Ordered: 16 January 1991
- Awarded: 16 January 1991
- Builder: Bath Iron Works
- Laid down: 8 August 1993
- Launched: 23 July 1994
- Commissioned: 13 April 1996
- Home port: Mayport
- Identification: MMSI number: 366986000; Callsign: NRCS; Hull number: DDG-64
- Motto: Resolute, Committed, Successful
- Status: in active service
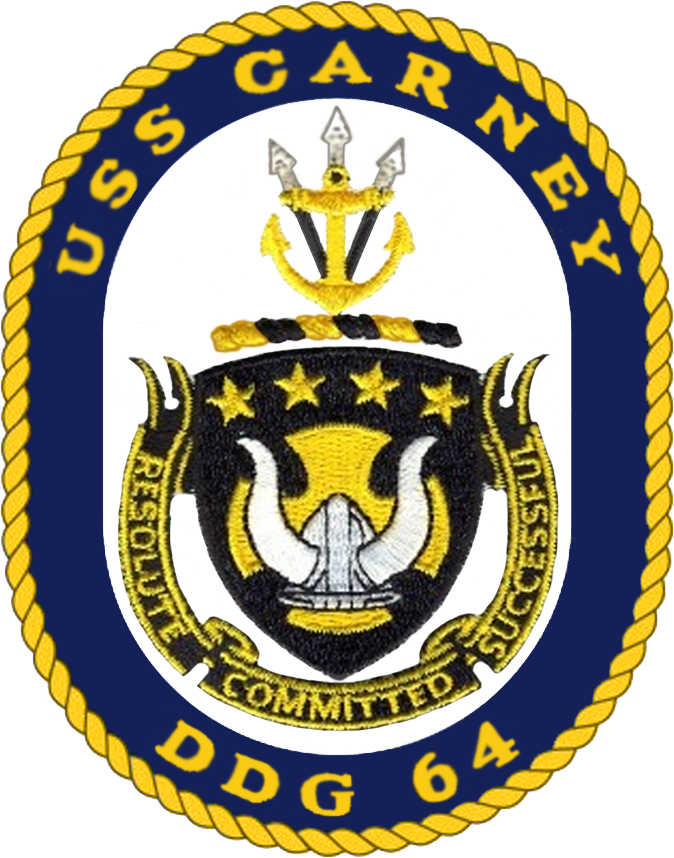
- Badge

General characteristics
- Class & type: Arleigh Burke-class destroyer
- Displacement: Light: approx. 6,800 long tons (6,900 t); Full: approx. 8,900 long tons (9,000 t)
- Length: 505 ft (154 m)
- Beam: 59 ft (18 m)
- Draft: 31 ft (9.4 m)
- Propulsion: 2 × shafts
- Speed: In excess of 30 kn (56 km/h; 35 mph)
- Range: 4,400 nmi (8,100 km; 5,100 mi) at 20 kn (37 km/h; 23 mph)
- Complement: 33 commissioned officers; 38 chief petty officers; 210 enlisted personnel
- Sensors & processing systems: AN/SPY-1D PESA 3D radar (Flight I, II, IIA); AN/SPY-6(V)1 AESA 3D radar (Flight III); AN/SPS-67(V)3 or (V)5 surface search radar (DDG-51 – DDG-118); AN/SPQ-9B surface search radar (DDG-119 onward); AN/SPS-73(V)12 surface search/navigation radar (DDG-51 – DDG-86); BridgeMaster E surface search/navigation radar (DDG-87 onward); 3 × AN/SPG-62 fire-control radar; Mk 46 optical sight system (Flight I, II, IIA); Mk 20 electro-optical sight system (Flight III); AN/SQQ-89 ASW combat system: AN/SQS-53C sonar array; AN/SQR-19 tactical towed array sonar (Flight I, II, IIA); TB-37U multi-function towed array sonar (DDG-113 onward); AN/SQQ-28 LAMPS III shipboard system
- Electronic warfare & decoys: AN/SLQ-32 electronic warfare suite; AN/SLQ-25 Nixie torpedo countermeasures; Mk 36 Mod 12 decoy launching systems; Mk 53 Nulka decoy launching systems; Mk 59 decoy launching systems
- Armament: Guns: 1 × 5-inch (127 mm)/54 mk 45 mod 1/2 (lightweight gun); 1 × 20 mm (0.8 in) Phalanx CIWS; 2 × 25 mm (0.98 in) Mk 38 machine gun system; 4 × 0.50 inches (12.7 mm) caliber guns; Missiles: 2 × Mk 141 Harpoon anti-ship missile launcher; 1 × SeaRAM CIWS; 1 × 29-cell, 1 × 61-cell (90 total cells) Mk 41 vertical launching system (VLS): RIM-66M surface-to-air missile; RIM-156 surface-to-air missile; RIM-161 anti-ballistic missile; BGM-109 Tomahawk cruise missile; RUM-139 vertical launch ASROC; Torpedoes: 2 × Mark 32 triple torpedo tubes: Mark 46 lightweight torpedo; Mark 50 lightweight torpedo; Mark 54 lightweight torpedo
- Aircraft carried: 1 × Sikorsky MH-60R

USS Carney (DDG-64) is an Arleigh Burke-class (Flight I) Aegis guided missile destroyer in the United States Navy. The guided-missile destroyer was the first to be named after Admiral Robert Carney, who served as Chief of Naval Operations during the Eisenhower administration.

Carney was laid down in 1993 at Bath Iron Works in Bath, Maine. She was launched in 1994 with Betty Taussig, daughter of Admiral Carney, as sponsor. She was placed in commission in 1996, and is homeported in Mayport, Florida. She has a range of 5,100 miles (4,400 nautical miles), travels at a speed in excess of 30 knots, and has a crew of 329. She is armed with standard missiles, Harpoon missile launchers, Tomahawk missiles, a 54 caliber lightweight gun, and torpedoes, and carries a multi-mission helicopter.

In 2002, she deployed to the Mediterranean Sea and the Persian Gulf in support of Operation Enduring Freedom. In 2011, Carney disrupted four piracy attempts and disarmed and captured 30 suspected pirates, in support of Operation Ocean Shield in the Gulf of Aden. In 2016, Carney took part in Operation Odyssey Lightning, against ISIS militants in Libya.

In December 2023, Carney and civilian-owned ships were attacked in the Red Sea, with ballistic missiles fired and drones launched from Yemen by Iranian-backed Houthi rebels.

== Service history ==
=== 1998–2010 ===
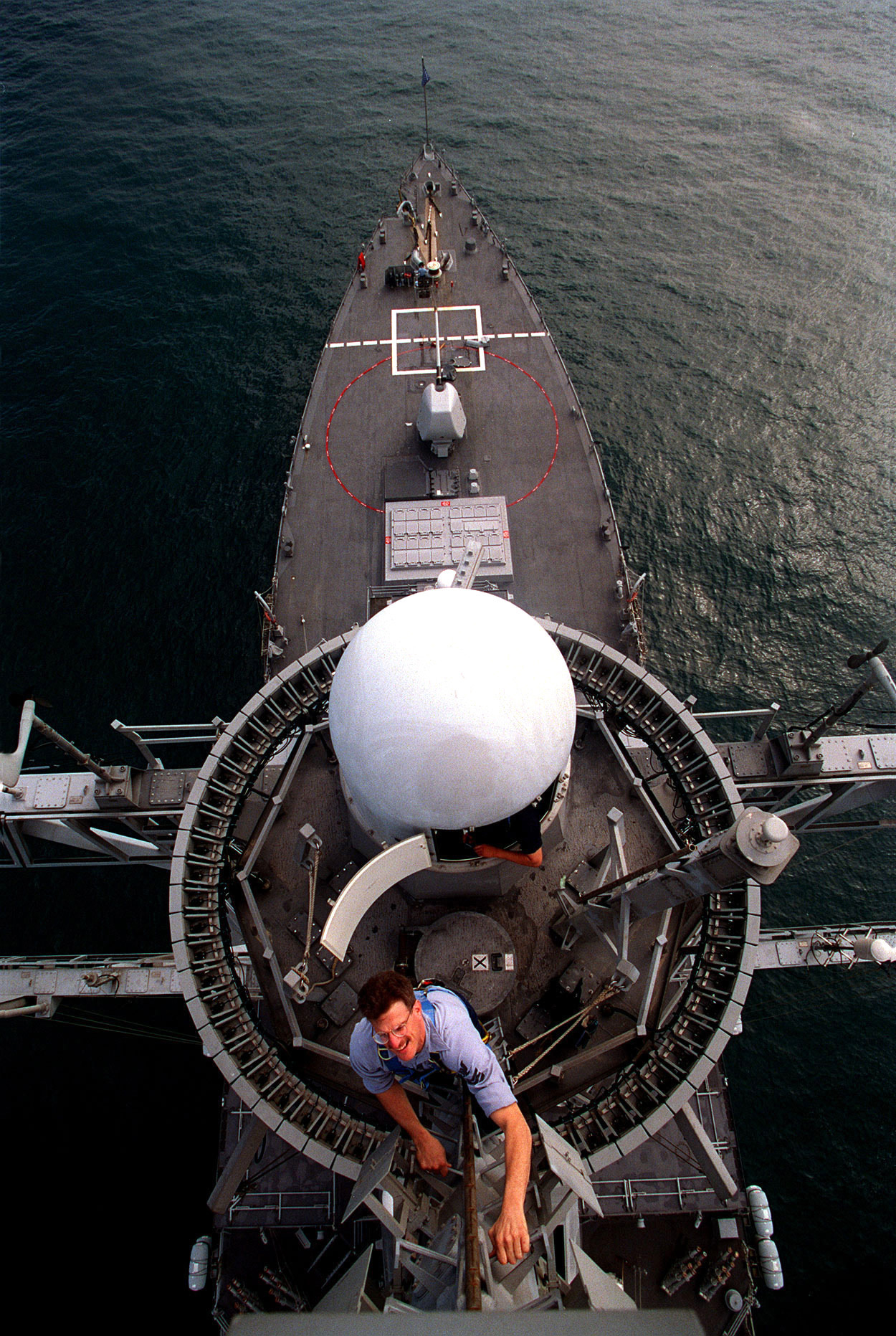
Carney from near the masthead

Carney was assigned to Destroyer Squadron 14 prior to commissioning. Carney transferred to Destroyer Squadron 24 in September 1998. Her first deployment was to the Mediterranean Sea in 1997 and 1998 as part of the USS George Washington battle group. In 1999 Carney deployed again to the Mediterranean, setting a milestone as the first United States Navy ship to operate in a bilateral United States-Japan Naval Exercise to be conducted in the Mediterranean Sea. In May 2001 Carney participated in Fleet Week in New York City.

In February 2002, Carney operated as part of the USS John F. Kennedy battle group while conducting phase one of technical evaluations of Cooperative Engagement Capability systems in the waters of Puerto Rico. Phase two of these evaluations were then conducted in the Virginia Capes operating area. She deployed to the Mediterranean Sea and the Persian Gulf in 2002 in support of Operation Enduring Freedom. On 10 June 2002 Secretary of Defense Donald Rumsfeld visited the ship in Manama, Bahrain. In December 2003 Carney participated in a Vandel Exercise testing the capability to intercept hostile missiles with the ship's missiles. On 13 August 2004 Carney put to sea from Naval Station Mayport in order to avoid the effects of Hurricane Charley.

In March and April 2007, Carney visited St. Kitts, Nevis, Antigua, Barbuda, St. Lucia, and Barbados to show the U.S.'s commitment to stability to its regional partners. During a visit to Barbados, Carney hosted a reception. Among the guests were Barbados Prime Minister Owen Arthur.

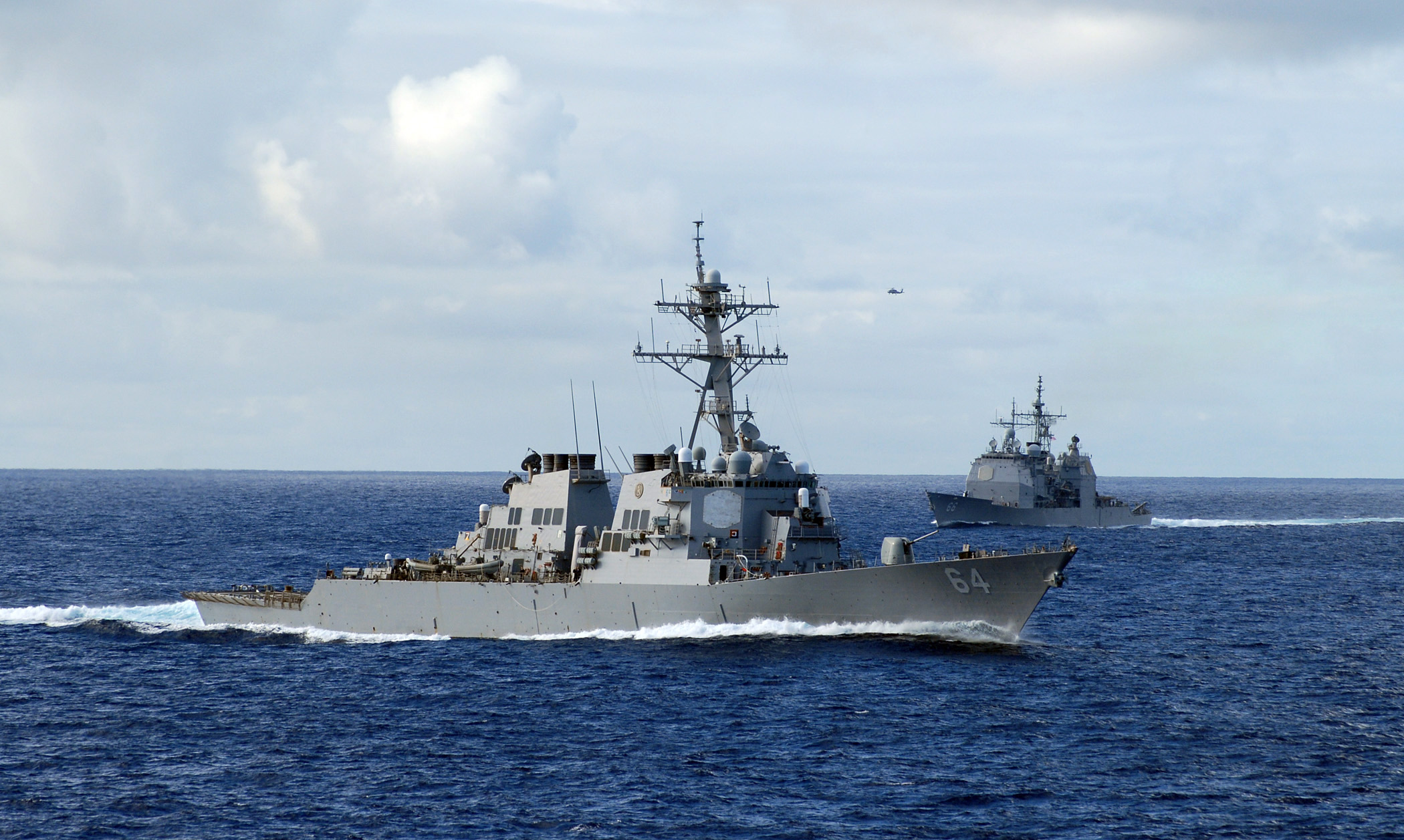
Carney with guided missile cruiser Hué City, 12 November 2007

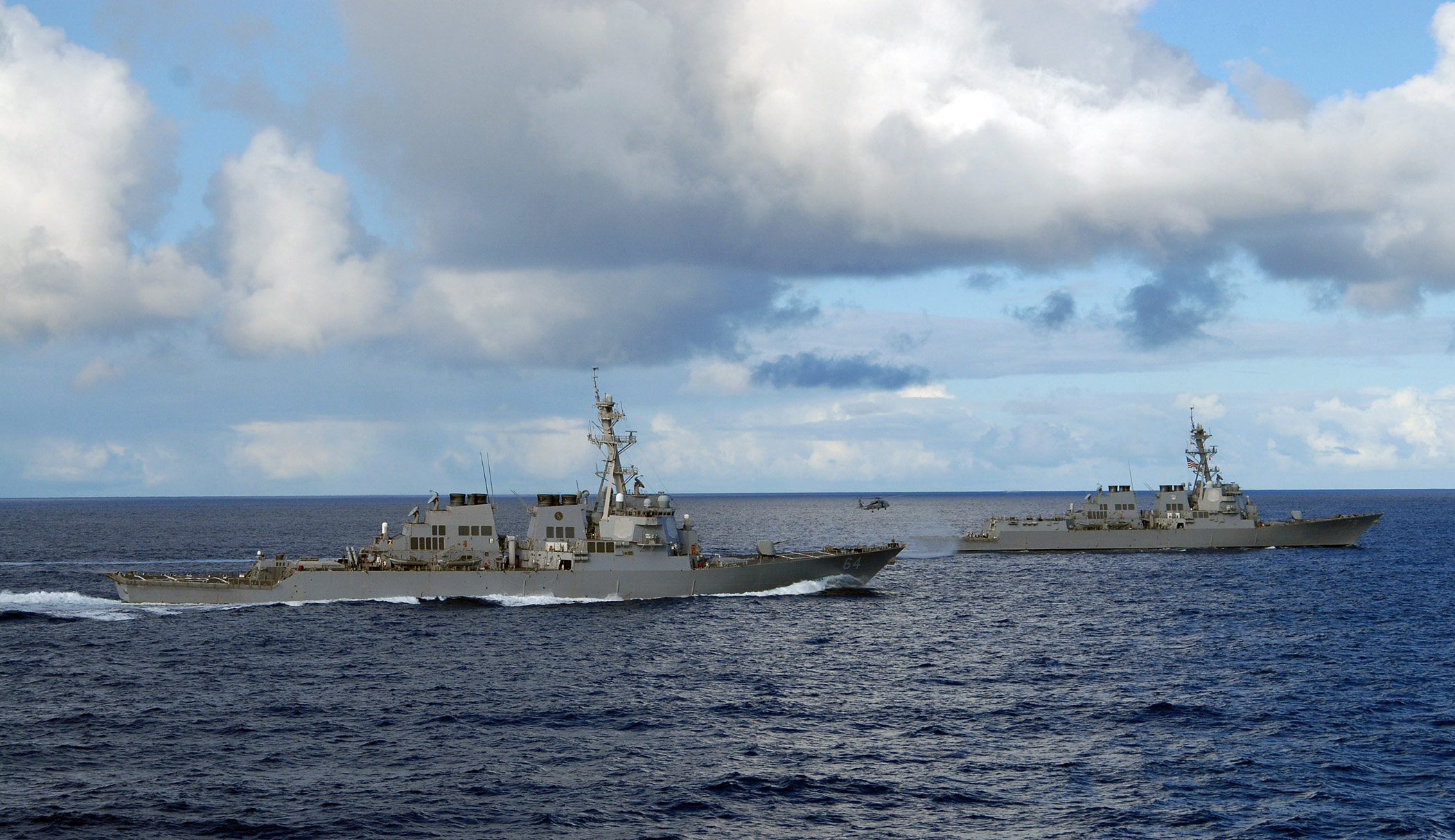
Carney with sister ship Oscar Austin, 12 November 2007

In November 2007, Carney deployed with Carrier Strike Group 10, led by the aircraft carrier USS Harry S. Truman, to the Middle East, where she carried out Theater Security Operations. She completed a number of multi-national exercises with a number of Middle Eastern countries and returned to Naval Station Mayport on 4 June 2008. In July 2008, Carney was in Philadelphia, Pennsylvania, for Fourth of July celebrations. On 8 September 2009 Carney arrived in New York City to participate in the 400th anniversary of Henry Hudson's arrival.

On 2 January 2010 Carney departed homeport for a scheduled deployment in the U.S. 5th Fleet and 6th Fleet AoR, as part of the Dwight D. Eisenhower carrier strike group. In May, the Carney took a month's sabbatical from Combined Task Force 150 and Combined Task Force 151 security operations, leaving the International Recommended Transit Corridor (IRTC) to participate in three separate and back-to-back multinational exercises: Arabian Shark 2010, an anti-submarine warfare exercise with Pakistan; Khunjar Haad 2010, an air defense exercise with Oman; and Eagle Salute 2010, a multi-warfare area exercise hosted by Egypt, returning to Naval Station Mayport on 31 July 2010.

=== 2011–2019 ===
On 1 August 2011, Carney departed Naval Station Mayport for a scheduled deployment as part of Standing NATO Maritime Group 1 (SNMG 1). During the deployment, she disrupted four piracy attempts, boarded nine vessels, approached 28 suspected pirate vessels, and disarmed and captured 30 suspected pirates in support of Operation Ocean Shield in the Gulf of Aden.

On 17 October 2013, Carney departed Naval Station Mayport for a scheduled independent deployment. On 25 May 2014, Carney returned to Naval Station Mayport after a seven-month Persian Gulf deployment in support of Maritime Intercept Operations (MIO).

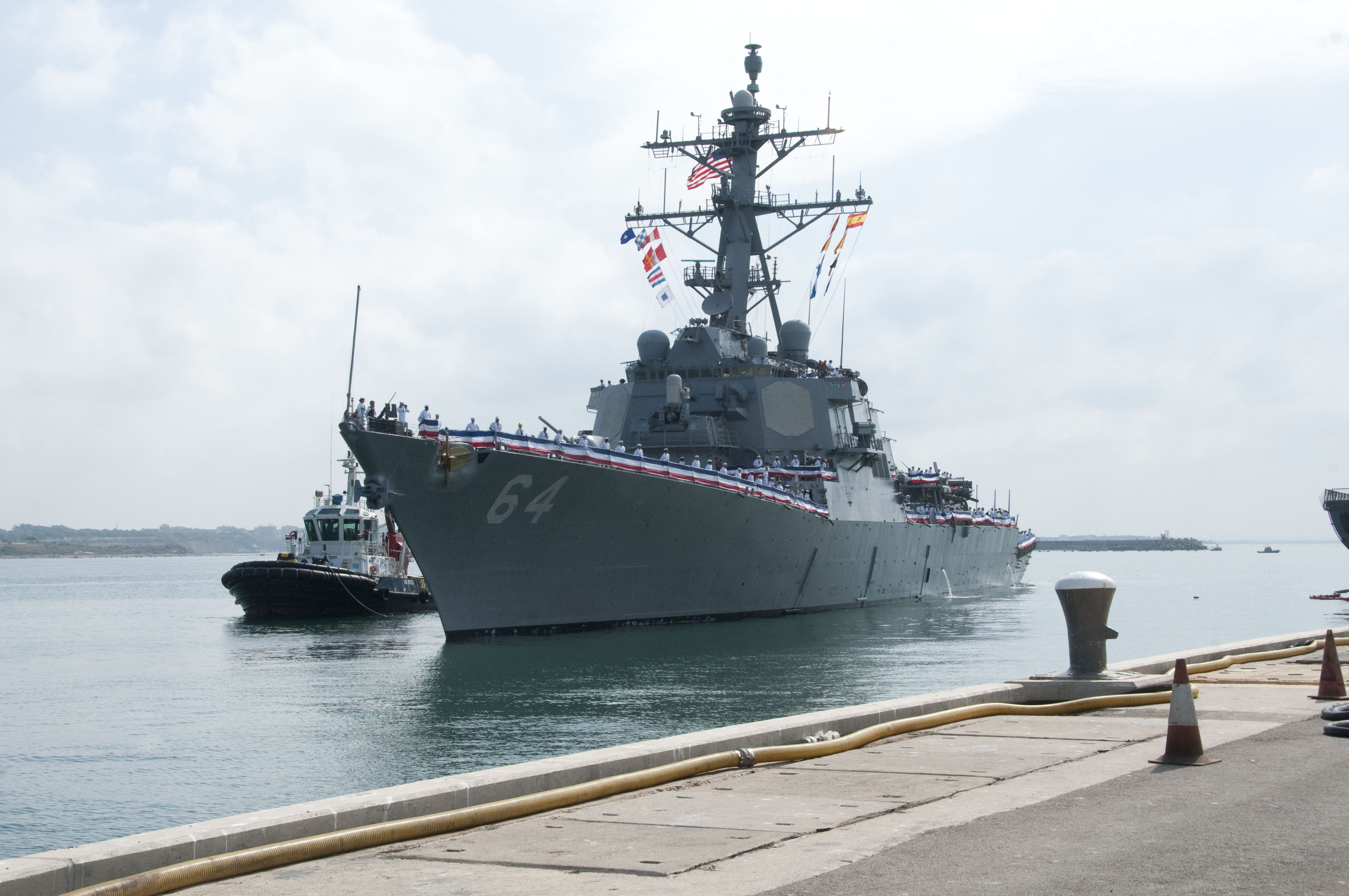
Carney pulls into Rota, Spain, 25 September 2015

On 25 September 2015, Carney arrived at her new homeport of Naval Station Rota, Spain, after a 19-day transit from Naval Station Mayport. On 29 July 2016, Carney was called on to support the rescue of 97 migrants whose small inflatable watercraft was adrift in the water. The ship provided aid to the migrants until the arrival of a rescue ship, MS Aquarius.

In August 2016, Carney took part in Operation Odyssey Lightning, serving as an escort ship to amphibious assault ship USS Wasp, whose aircraft carried out airstrikes on ISIS militants in Libya. Carney also fired illumination rounds from her 5-inch gun to help U.S.-backed Libyan ground forces fighting ISIS in Sirte. Carney also conducted shore bombardments of ISIS targets with her 5-inch gun, firing 285 shells during the course of the deployment.

In November 2016, Carney was deployed in Drapetsona port, Greece, to provide air cover for President Barack Obama's visit to Athens. In late March 2017 Carney arrived at HMNB Clyde in Scotland in preparation for NATO Exercise Joint Warrior.

On 17 February 2018, Carney joined USS Ross (DDG-71) in the Black Sea near Russia for an "unspecified regional proactive presence mission". The move followed increased tensions between Russia and the U.S. after American federal prosecutors announced indictments against 13 Russian citizens for their alleged interference in the 2016 U.S. presidential campaign.

=== 2020–present ===
On 27 June 2020, Carney departed Rota, Spain, for her homeport shift to Mayport, Florida.

On 8 October 2023, the day after the Hamas attack on Israel, U.S. Secretary of Defense Lloyd Austin directed the Gerald R. Ford carrier strike group to the Eastern Mediterranean in response. Along with the carrier, the group includes the cruiser Normandy, and the destroyers Carney, Ramage, Roosevelt and Thomas Hudner. From then until December 2023, the destroyer was at the forefront of operations to destroy Houthi drones and missiles in the Red Sea, as commercial vessels repeatedly came under attack by the Iran-allied Houthi militants in Yemen.

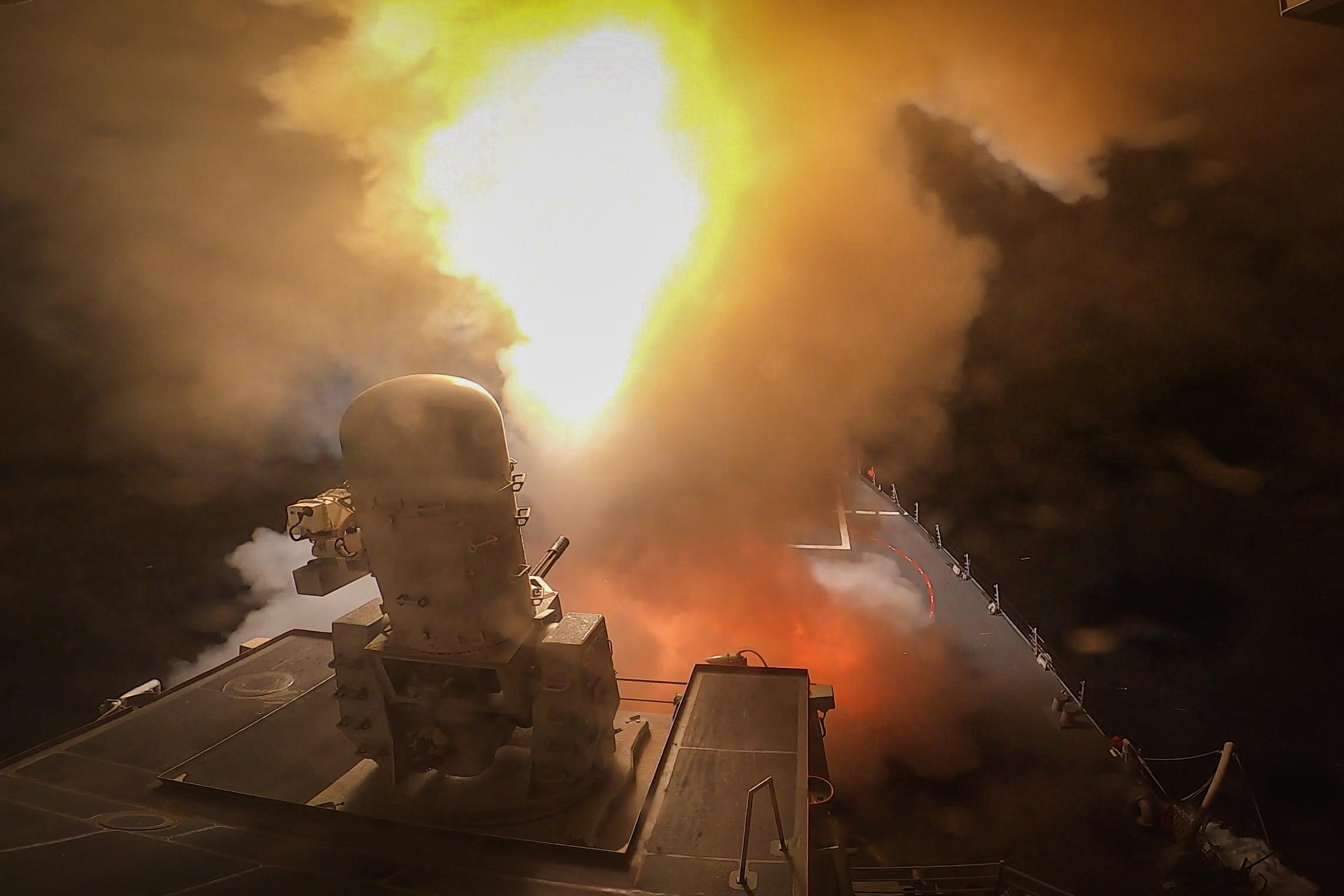
Carney engages Houthi missiles, October 2023

On 19 October 2023, Carney intercepted three cruise missiles and eight drones fired by Houthi militants in Yemen. Although the targets were uncertain, the missiles and drones were shot down because they were headed north along the Red Sea in the direction of Israel amid rising tensions in the region during the Gaza war. It was subsequently reported that Carney actually encountered a larger and more sustained barrage than was previously known on that day, shooting down four cruise missiles and 15 drones over a period of nine hours. On 29 November 2023, Carney shot down a KAS-04 drone launched from a Houthi-controlled area of Yemen in the Red Sea.

On 3 December 2023, Carney and civilian-owned commercial ships were attacked in international waters in the southern Red Sea, with anti-ship ballistic missiles fired from Yemen by Iranian-backed Houthi rebels. Missiles struck three commercial ships, while Carney shot down three drones in self-defense during the hours-long assault. The United States Central Command said in a statement: "We ... have every reason to believe that these attacks, while launched by the Houthis in Yemen, are fully enabled by Iran." On 16 December 2023 while operating in the Red Sea, Carney successfully shot down a barrage of 14 unmanned aerial system (UAS) one-way attack drones launched from Houthi-controlled areas of Yemen. Vice Admiral Brad Cooper, head of U.S. 5th Fleet, subsequently visited the ship and presented combat medals to five sailors for their "exceptional performance" in the engagement. Cooper also recognized the whole crew of the Carney with the Navy's Combat Action Ribbon, which is awarded when a sailor has “rendered satisfactory performance under enemy fire while actively participating in a ground or surface combat engagement". Carney’s commanding officer, Commander Jeremy Robertson, and another sailor received Navy Commendation Medals from Cooper, and Robertson received a Bronze Star, while three other crew members received Navy and Marine Corps Achievement Medals.

On 13 January 2024, Carney conducted follow-on action by firing Tomahawk cruise missiles at Houthi rebels in Yemen a day after the main strike package. Later, Carney and other coalition ships responded to a strike by the Houthis on the British oil tanker MV Marlin Luanda on 26 January 2024. She arrived on scene a few hours after INS Visakhapatnam to render firefighting aid. On 26 January 2024, Carney shot down an anti-ship ballistic missile fired by the Houthis in the Gulf of Aden. On 30 January 2024, Carney reportedly shot down an anti-ship ballistic missile fired by the Houthis in the Gulf of Aden with an SM-6 missile, marking the first publicly acknowledged SM-6 combat intercept by the DOD.

On 5 March 2024, Carney shot down one anti-ship ballistic missile and three one-way attack unmanned aerial systems launched by the Houthis in the Red Sea. On 13–14 April 2024, Carney and USS Arleigh Burke shot down at least six Iranian ballistic missiles during the 2024 Iranian strikes in Israel. Carney returned to Naval Station Mayport on 20 May 2024 after a seven-month deployment and fifty-one Houthi Engagements. During the course of her deployment, Carney participated in the second most combat of any U.S. Naval ship since World War II.

=== Awards ===
- Combat Action Ribbon – December 2023
- Navy Unit Commendation – (October 1997 – April 1998, May 2000 – May 2001, October 2023 - May 2024)
- Navy Meritorious Unit Commendation – (January 1999 – September 2001, April–September 2002)
- Navy E Ribbon – (1997, 1998, 2001, 2007, 2009, 2012, 2014, 2017, 2020)
- Arizona Memorial Trophy – (2015–2016)
- Battenberg Cup – (2009)
- Marjorie Sterrett Battleship Fund Award - (2007)

== Upgrades ==
On 12 November 2009, the Missile Defense Agency announced that Carney would be upgraded during fiscal 2012 to RIM-161 Standard Missile 3 (SM-3) capability in order to function as part of the Aegis Ballistic Missile Defense System.

In 2016, four destroyers patrolling with the U.S. 6th Fleet based in Naval Station Rota, Spain, including Carney received self-protection upgrades, replacing the aft Phalanx CIWS 20mm Vulcan cannon with the SeaRAM 11-cell RIM-116 Rolling Airframe Missile launcher. The SeaRam uses the same sensor dome as the Phalanx. This was the first time the close-range ship defense system was paired with an Aegis ship. All four ships to receive the upgrade were either Flight I or II, meaning they originally had two Phalanx CIWS systems when launched. SeaRAM was first introduced to the Independence-class littoral combat ship.

== Ship's crest ==
Azure, a cross pattée or bearing a Viking helmet Proper, in chief four mullets of the second. Symbolism: Dark blue and gold are the colors traditionally associated with the Navy and recall the sea and excellence. The gold cross suggests the Navy Cross, one of the many decorations awarded to Admiral Carney for operations against enemy Japanese forces during the Battle of Leyte Gulf, from 23 to 26 October 1944... "(He) rendered invaluable assistance in formulating the plans for a series of combat operations in which tack forces of the third fleet engaged capital ships of the Imperial Japanese Navy, waging devastating attacks on major Japanese combatant and aircraft carrier task forces in the vicinity of Mindora, the Sulu Sea, and areas northeast of Luzon and off the central Philippines..."

The helmet is symbolic of ancestral Viking and Celtic ferocity in combat. The four stars stand for the four Distinguished Service Medals received. Crest: Issuing from a wreath Or and Azure, three demi-spears. The two spears form a "V" alluding to Admiral Carney's Legion of Merit with a "V" (Combat Distinguishing Device) for exceptionally meritorious conduct...in action against enemy Japanese forces... 5 March 1943 – 6 March 1943 and the Bronze Star Medal with combat "V" for operations in the Solomon Islands area on the night of 29 July 1943. The three spears represent submarine, surface and air warfare. The anchor is reminiscent of Maritime tradition, United States naval strength, sea prowess and excellence of achievement. Motto: A tripartite scroll Azure doubled, garnished and inscribed "RESOLUTE COMMITTED SUCCESSFUL" in gold the coat of arms in full color as in the blazon, all upon a white background enclosed within a dark blue oval border edged on the outside with a gold rope and bearing the inscription "USS CARNEY" at top and "DDG 64" in base all gold.
