= Bob Hoover =

American aviator (1922–2016)

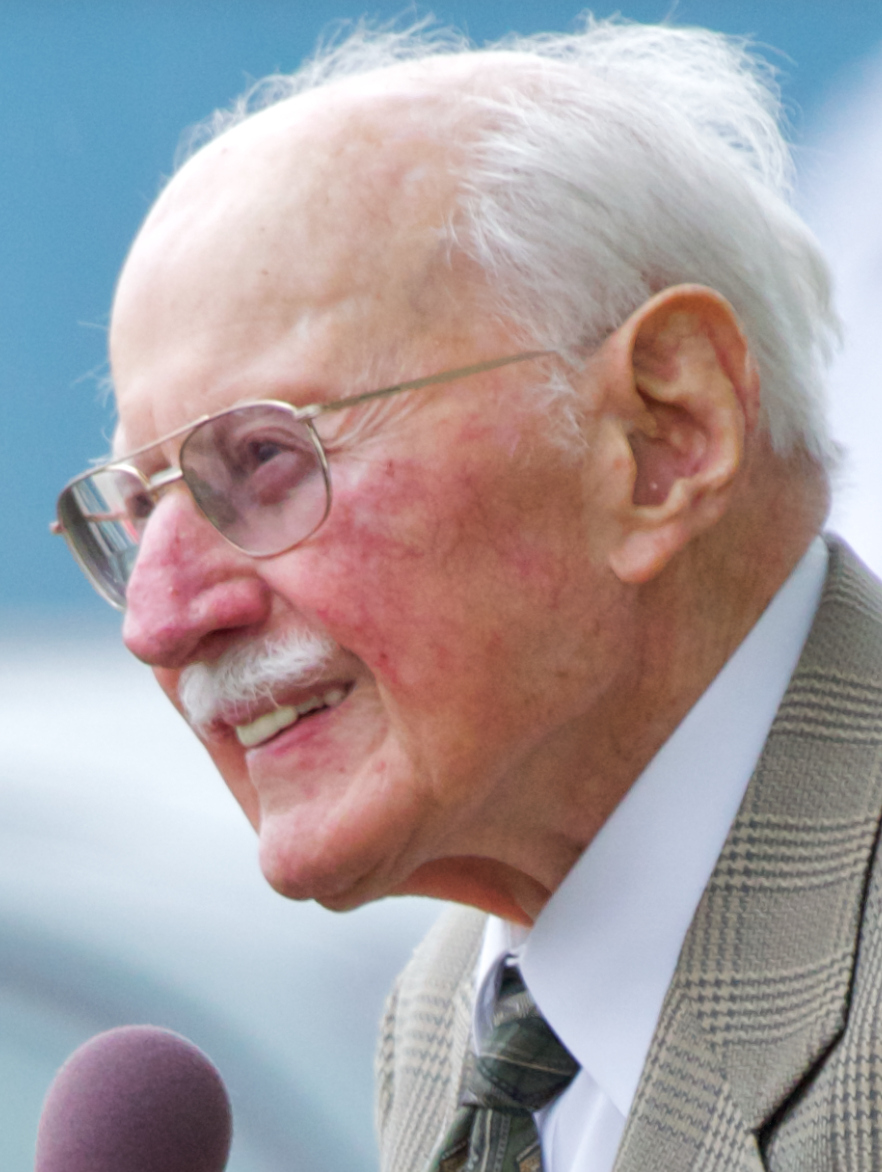
- Hoover in 2011
- Born: Robert Anderson Hoover; January 24, 1922; Nashville, Tennessee, U.S.
- Died: October 25, 2016 (aged 94); Los Angeles, California, U.S.
- Spouse: Colleen Hoover (m. 1948; died 2016)
- Military career
- Allegiance: United States
- Branch: Tennessee National Guard; United States Army Air Forces; United States Air Force
- Service years: 1940–1950
- Rank: First Lieutenant
- Units: 52nd Fighter Group; Flight Evaluation Group
- Conflicts: World War II; Korean War
- Awards: Distinguished Flying Cross; Soldier's Medal for Valor; Air Medal with Clusters; Purple Heart; Croix de guerre
- Other work: Test pilot, flight instructor and air show pilot (1948–1999)

Robert Anderson Hoover (January 24, 1922 – October 25, 2016) was an American fighter pilot, test pilot, flight instructor, and record-setting air show aviator.

Hoover flew Spitfires in the United States Army Air Forces during World War II and was shot down in 1944 off the coast of France. He was held for over a year in a German POW camp before eventually escaping and flying to safety in a stolen enemy aircraft. He then worked as a United States Air Force and civilian test pilot after the war, flying chase for Chuck Yeager's Bell X-1 supersonic flight in 1947, and as a flight instructor for North American Aviation during the Korean War.

He is best known as an air show display pilot, who flew for nearly 50 years until his retirement in 1999. Referred to as the "pilot's pilot", Hoover revolutionized modern aerobatic flying and has been described in many aviation circles as one of the greatest pilots of all time. He received the Distinguished Flying Cross and Wright Brothers Memorial Trophy, and was inducted into the National Aviation Hall of Fame in 1988 and Aerospace Walk of Honor in 1992, along with several other military and civilian awards and accolades throughout his life and career. In 2013, Flying magazine ranked him 10th on its list of the 51 Heroes of Aviation.

== Aviation career ==
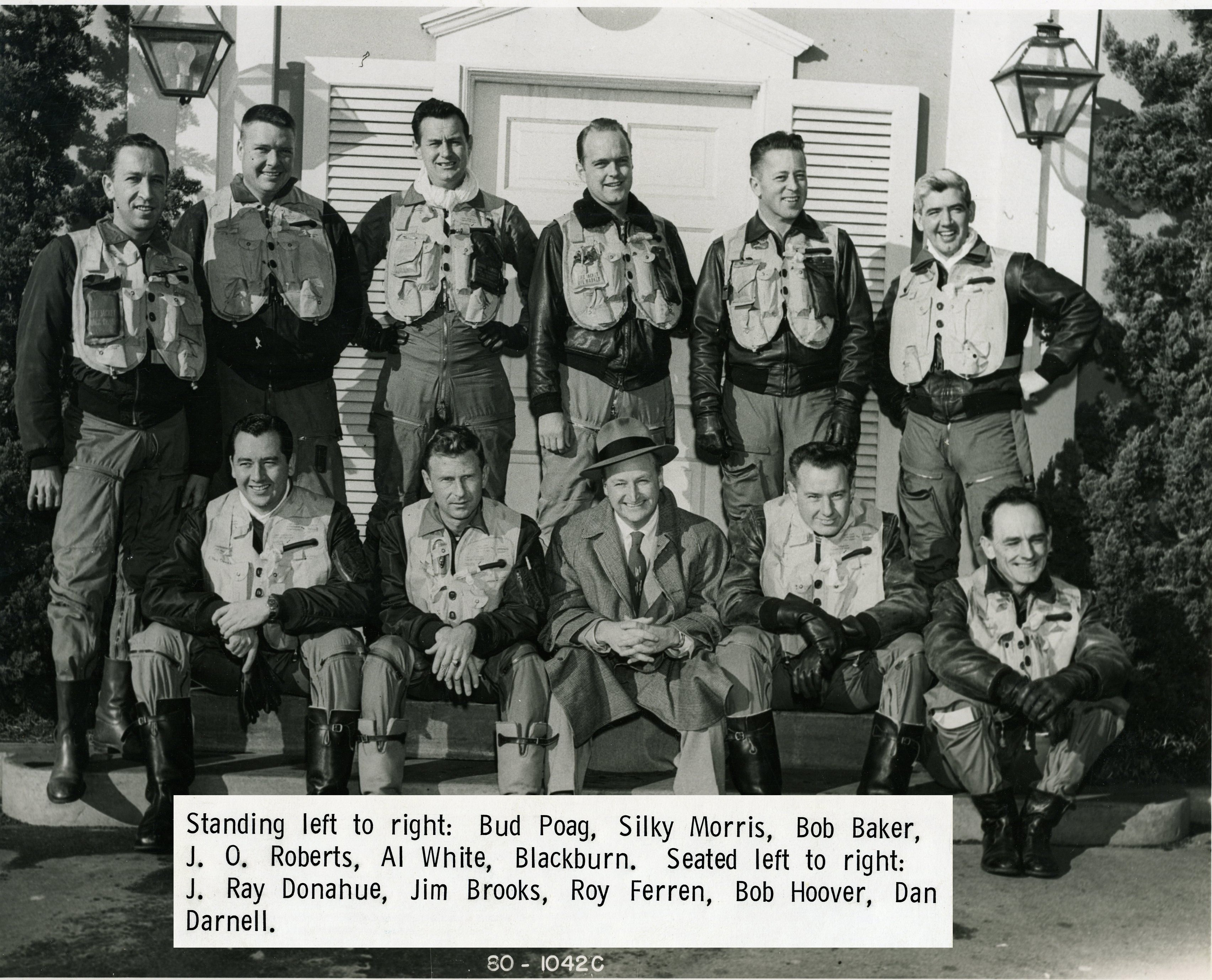
Bob Hoover photographed with North American Aviation test pilots, bottom row second from right, c.1957

Hoover learned to fly at Berry Field in Nashville, Tennessee while working at a local grocery store to pay for the flight training. He enlisted in the Tennessee National Guard and was sent for pilot training with the United States Army. Assigned to the 98th Fighter Squadron, he was assigned to advanced training in Florida, flying P-40Ks, and was accidentally shot down by a fellow pilot over Mullet Key Bay, Florida, on November 9, 1942.

During World War II, Hoover was sent to Casablanca, where his first major assignment was flight testing the assembled aircraft ready for service. He was later assigned to the Supermarine Spitfire-equipped 52d Fighter Group in Sicily. On February 9, 1944, on his 59th mission, he was shot down off the coast of Southern France and taken prisoner. He spent 16 months at Stalag Luft 1, a German prisoner-of-war camp in Barth, Germany.

One night due to the conditions in the camp there was a riot and fight involving several thousand inmates and Hoover used this opportunity to scale the fence and escape, despite the fact that Dwight Eisenhower had issued the order for prisoners to no longer attempt to escape due to the rapid advance of the Allies. He was joined by two other POWs and together they made their way down a dirt road to a German farmhouse where a lone woman made the starving men some food. As they were leaving Hoover wrote a note for her to give to the American army in the coming weeks stating that she had assisted the three of them, and to treat her kindly. The woman also gave the trio a handgun with several extra magazines.

The men then obtained bicycles and rode for several miles before they came across a seemingly abandoned airfield. Hoover, a pilot, began inspecting the planes, but they all seemed damaged and incapable of flight. He eventually found a reconnaissance plane, a Focke-Wulf Fw 190, with some damage, but a full tank of fuel. A German mechanic stunned the trio sneaking up on him demanding they halt but almost immediately had a gun pointed at him as Hoover demanded he start the engine of the plane that he was investigating. With the engine started, Hoover made the deal that since the aircraft only had room for one occupant that the other two POWs would keep the gun to aid in their escape. He did not even taxi towards the runway, simply hitting the throttle and heading straight out across a field to take off.

Hoover did not have a parachute and was in an enemy aircraft flying towards Allied lines knowing he would be an easy target for an American or British fighter pilot. He did not even have a means to tell whether he had safely reached Allied territory; he simply knew to look for the windmills of Holland and land when he saw them. After flying all the way across The Netherlands to the Zuider Zee he finally spotted windmills and landed in a field, at which point he was surrounded by angry Dutch farmers armed with pitchforks who were under the impression they had just captured a German. Eventually a British supply truck came by at which point Hoover was able to explain who he was.

After the war, he was assigned to flight-test duty at Wilbur Wright Field near Dayton, Ohio. There he impressed and befriended Chuck Yeager. When Yeager was later asked whom he wanted for flight crew for the supersonic Bell X-1 flight, the first flight to break the sound barrier, he named Hoover. Hoover became Yeager's backup pilot in the Bell X-1 program and flew chase for Yeager in a Lockheed P-80 Shooting Star during the Mach 1 flight. He also flew chase for the 50th anniversary of the Mach 1 flight in a General Dynamics F-16 Fighting Falcon.

Hoover was a graduate of both the USAF Test Pilot School in class 1946c, and the US Naval Test Pilot School in Class 6.

Hoover left the air force for civilian jobs in 1948. After a brief time with the Allison Engine Company, he worked as a test/demonstration pilot with North American Aviation, in which capacity he went to Korea to teach pilots flying combat missions in the Korean War how to dive-bomb with the North American F-86 Sabre. During his six weeks in Korea, Hoover flew many combat bombing missions over enemy territory, but was denied permission to engage in air-to-air combat flights.

During the 1950s, Hoover visited many active-duty, reserve, and Air National Guard units to demonstrate the capabilities of various aircraft to their pilots. Hoover flew flight tests on the North American FJ-2 Fury, F-86 Sabre, and the North American F-100 Super Sabre.

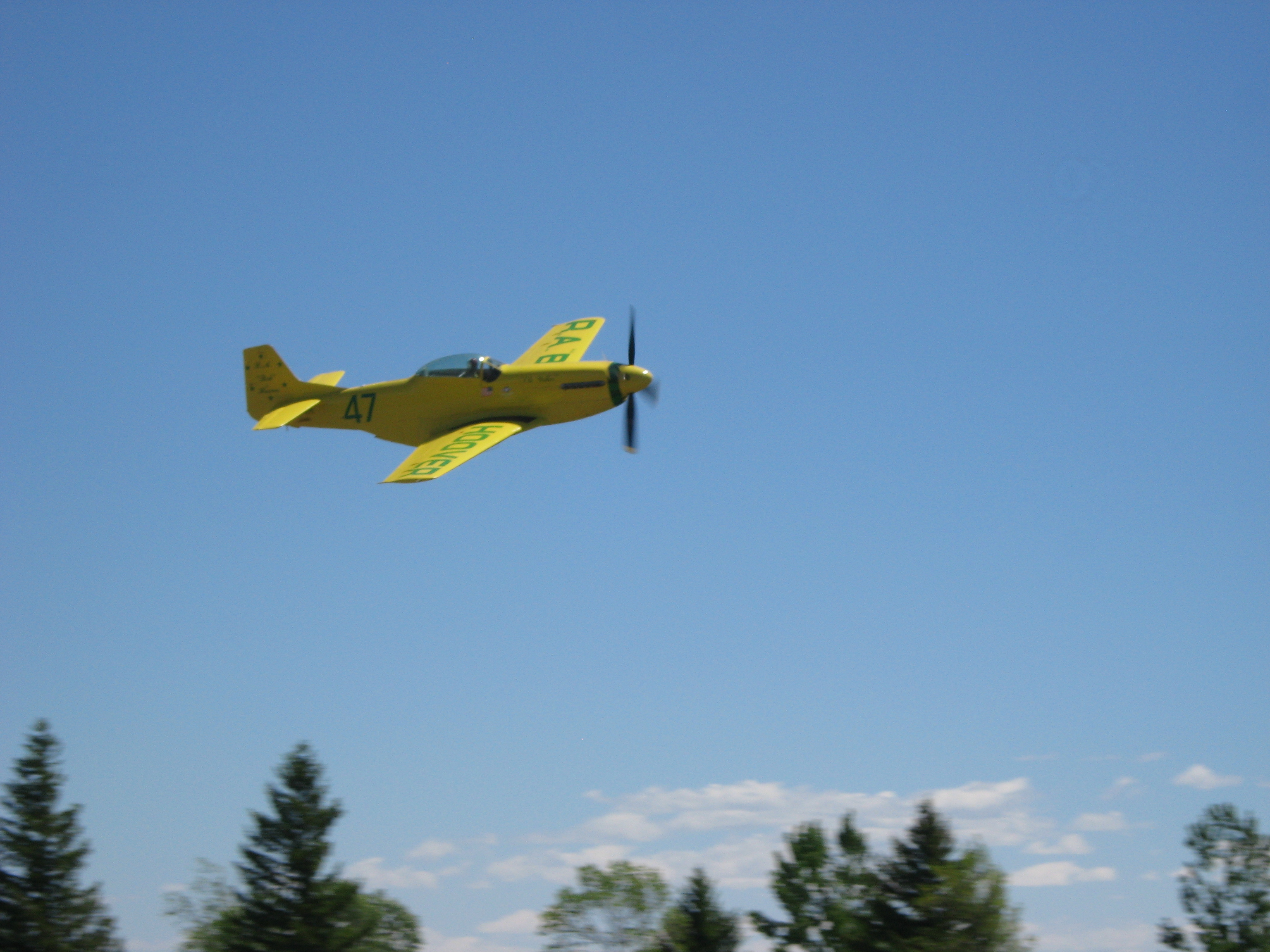
"Ole Yeller," flown by John Bagley at an air show in Rexburg, Idaho

In the early 1960s, Hoover began flying a North American P-51 Mustang at air shows around the country. The Hoover Mustang (registration N2251D) was purchased by North American Aviation from Dave Lindsay's Cavalier Aircraft Corp. in 1962. A second Mustang (N51RH), later named "Ole Yeller", was purchased by North American Rockwell from Cavalier in 1971 to replace the earlier aircraft, which had been destroyed in a ground accident when an oxygen bottle exploded after being overfilled. Hoover demonstrated the Mustang and later an Aero Commander at hundreds of air shows until his retirement in the 1990s. In 1997, Hoover sold "Ole Yeller" to his good friend John Bagley of Rexburg, Idaho. "Ole Yeller" still flies frequently and is based at the Legacy Flight Museum in Rexburg.

Hoover set transcontinental, time-to-climb, and speed records, and personally knew such great aviators as Orville Wright, Eddie Rickenbacker, Charles Lindbergh, Jimmy Doolittle, Chuck Yeager, Jacqueline Cochran, Neil Armstrong and Yuri Gagarin.

In 1969, Hoover was president of the Society of Experimental Test Pilots (SETP), and he had been a personal friend of Charles Lindbergh since the early 1950s, when the reclusive Lindbergh was using the pseudonym "Mr Schwartz". Hoover persuaded Lindbergh to attend the SETP annual symposium and banquet at the Beverley Hilton, as his guest. At the top table, they were joined by Neil Armstrong, who had just been released from quarantine after the Apollo 11 mission. Hoover introduced both Lindbergh and Armstrong, to the surprise of the press and other attendees, and many photos were published of Hoover's wife Colleen flanked by both 'heroes' of aviation. The story of the occasion was later narrated by Hoover in the 2014 documentary film Flying the Feathered Edge: The Bob Hoover Project.

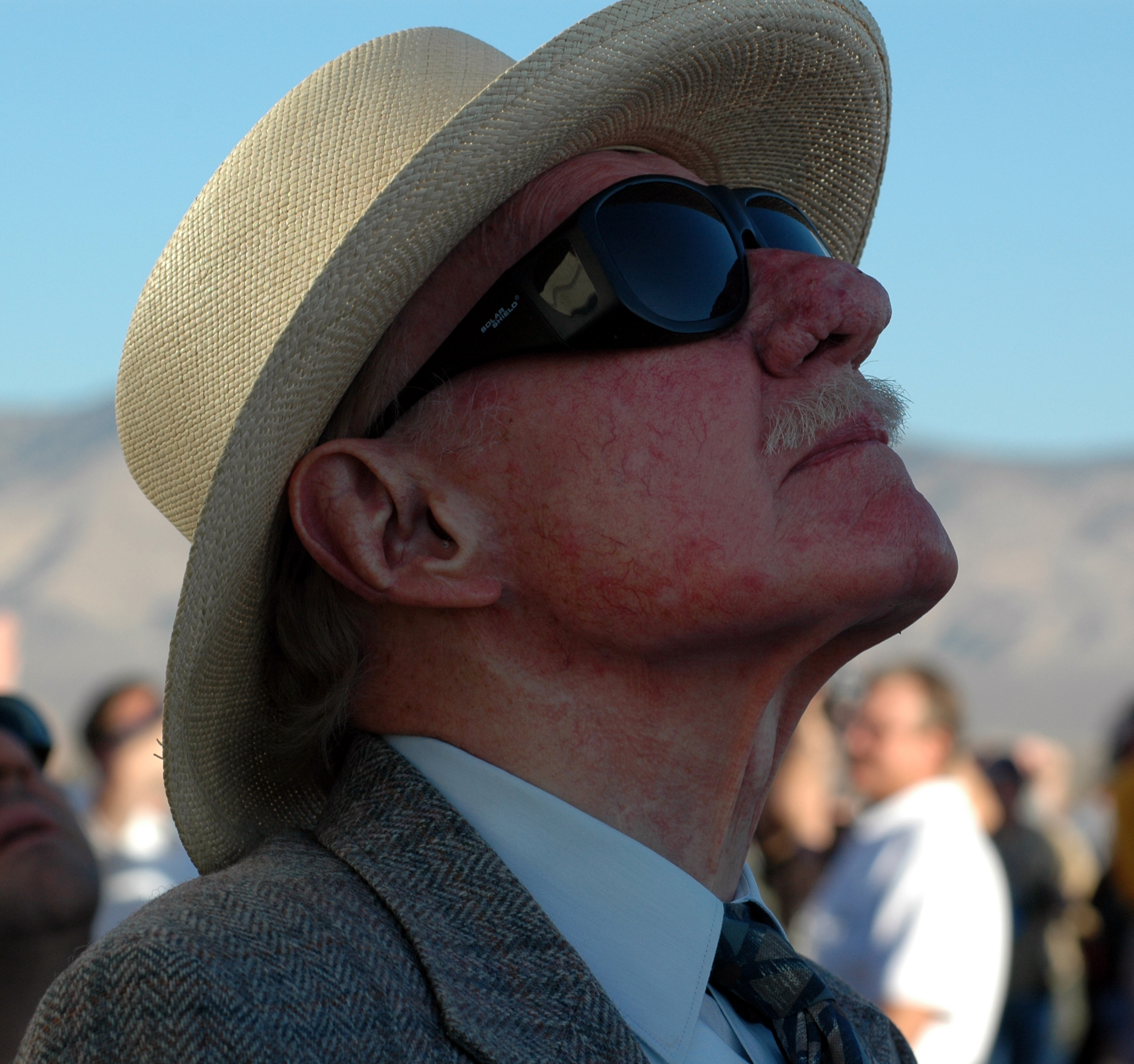
Hoover at the final launch of SpaceShipOne in 2004

Hoover was best known for his civil air show career, which started when he was hired to demonstrate the capabilities of Aero Commander's Shrike Commander, a twin piston-engine business aircraft that had developed a staid reputation due to its bulky shape. Hoover showed the strength of the aircraft as he put it through rolls, loops and other maneuvers, which most people would not associate with executive aircraft. As a grand finale, he would shut down both engines and execute a loop and an eight-point hesitation slow roll as he headed back to the runway. Upon landing he would touch down on one tire followed gradually by the other. After pulling off the runway, he would restart the engines to taxi back to the parking area. On airfields with large enough parking ramps, such as the Reno Stead Airport, where the Reno Air Races take place, Hoover would sometimes land directly on the ramp and coast all the way back to his parking spot in front of the grandstand without restarting the engines.

He was also known for creating the stunt of successfully pouring a cup of tea while performing a 1G barrel roll.

== End of career ==
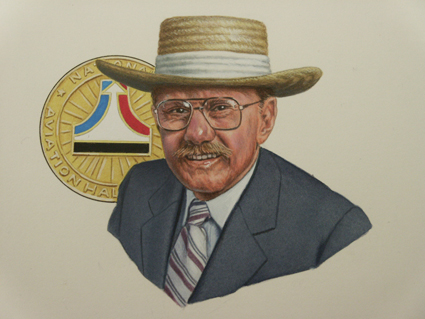
Hoover's 2005 Gathering of Eagles Lithograph

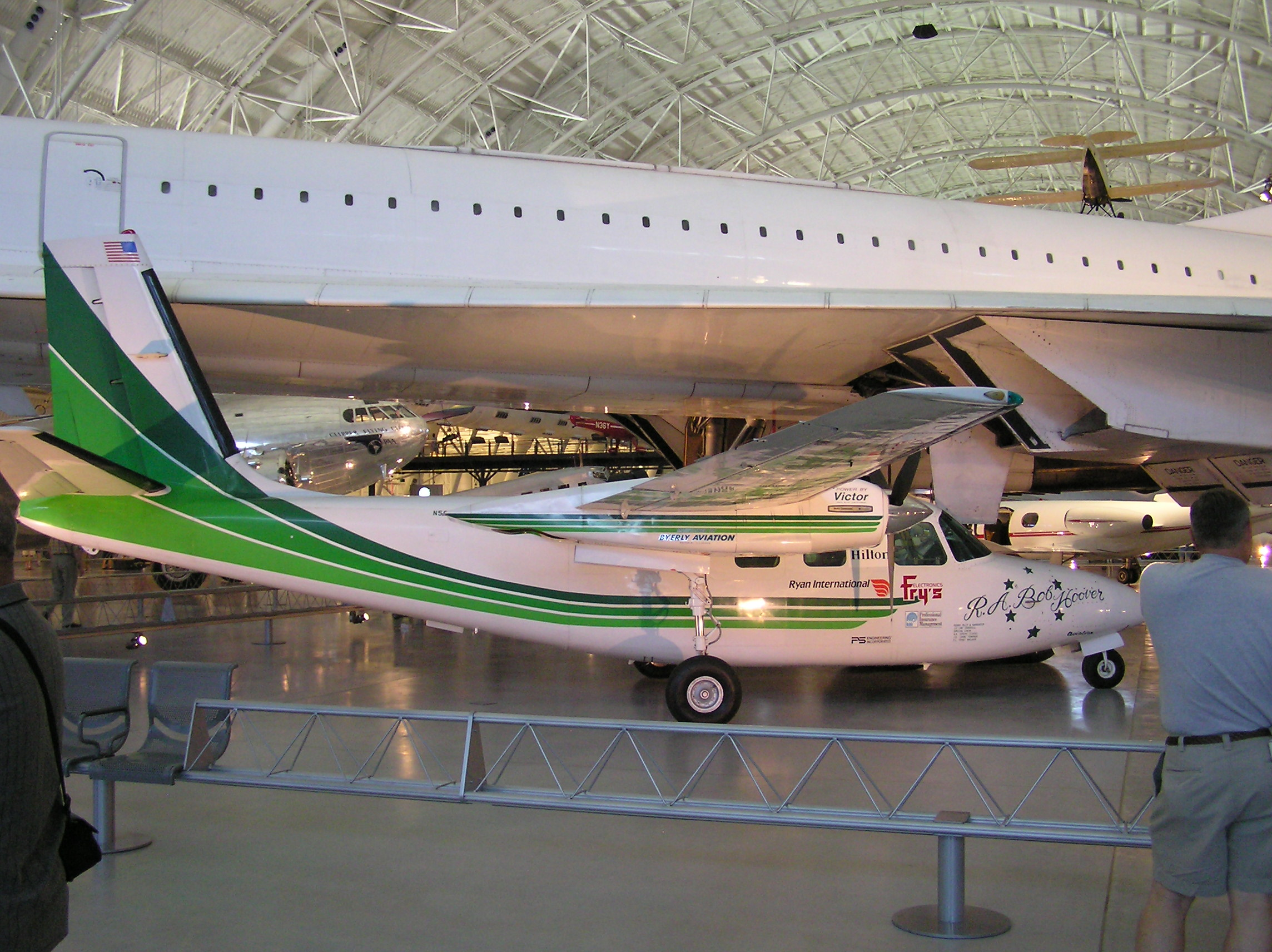
Hoover's Shrike Commander at the Steven F. Udvar-Hazy Center

His air show aerobatics career ended in 1999, but was marked by issues with the Federal Aviation Administration (FAA) over his medical certification that began when Hoover's medical certificate was revoked by the FAA in the early 1990s.

Shortly before his revocation, Hoover experienced serious engine problems in a North American T-28 Trojan off the coast of California. During his return to Torrance, California, he was able to keep the engine running intermittently by constantly manipulating the throttle, mixture, and propeller controls. The engine seized at the moment of touchdown. Hoover believed his successful management of this difficult emergency should have convinced the FAA that he hadn't lost any ability. Meanwhile, Hoover was granted a pilot license and medical certificate by Australia's aviation authority. Hoover's United States medical certificate was restored shortly afterward and he returned to the American air show circuit for several years before retiring in 1999. At 77 years old Hoover still felt capable of performing and passed a FAA physical post-retirement, but he was unable to obtain insurance for air shows. Although he had had free insurance for several years as part of air show sponsorship deals, he was forced in 1999 to pay for it out of his own pocket and could not get coverage under $2 million. His final air show was on November 13, 1999, at Luke Air Force Base. His last flight in his famous Shrike Commander was on October 10, 2003, from Lakeland, Florida, to the Smithsonian Air and Space Museum in Washington, D.C., with long-time friend Steve Clegg.

Following Hoover's retirement, his Shrike Commander was placed on display at the Steven F. Udvar-Hazy Center of the National Air and Space Museum, in Dulles, Virginia.

In 2007, Hoover was inducted into the International Air & Space Hall of Fame at the San Diego Air & Space Museum.

== Death ==
He died on October 25, 2016, near his home in Los Angeles at the age of 94 from heart failure.

A memorial service and celebration of life honoring Bob Hoover was held on November 18, 2016, hosted by aerobatic legend Sean D. Tucker and world renowned pilot Clay Lacy at the Van Nuys Airport in California. Nearly 1,500 family and friends attended the memorial, with speakers such as Hollywood actor and pilot Harrison Ford, film producer David Ellison, Jonna Doolittle (granddaughter of Jimmy Doolittle) and many others. The event culminated with a United States Air Force Honor Guard presenting an American flag to the family, coincident with a three-element fly-over. The lead element featured a Rockwell Sabreliner, similar to another aircraft that Hoover flew during air shows, along with two F-16 Fighting Falcons from the United States Air Force Thunderbirds aerobatic team and a Canadair CT-114 Tutor from the Royal Canadian Air Force Snowbirds aerobatic team. The second element featured the USAF Heritage Flight with a Lockheed Martin F-22 Raptor and two F-86 Sabres, and the third and final installment featured a four-ship World War II warbird flight, with the P-51 "Ole Yeller" pulling up in the missing man formation on the final note of "Taps".

== Honors and recognition ==
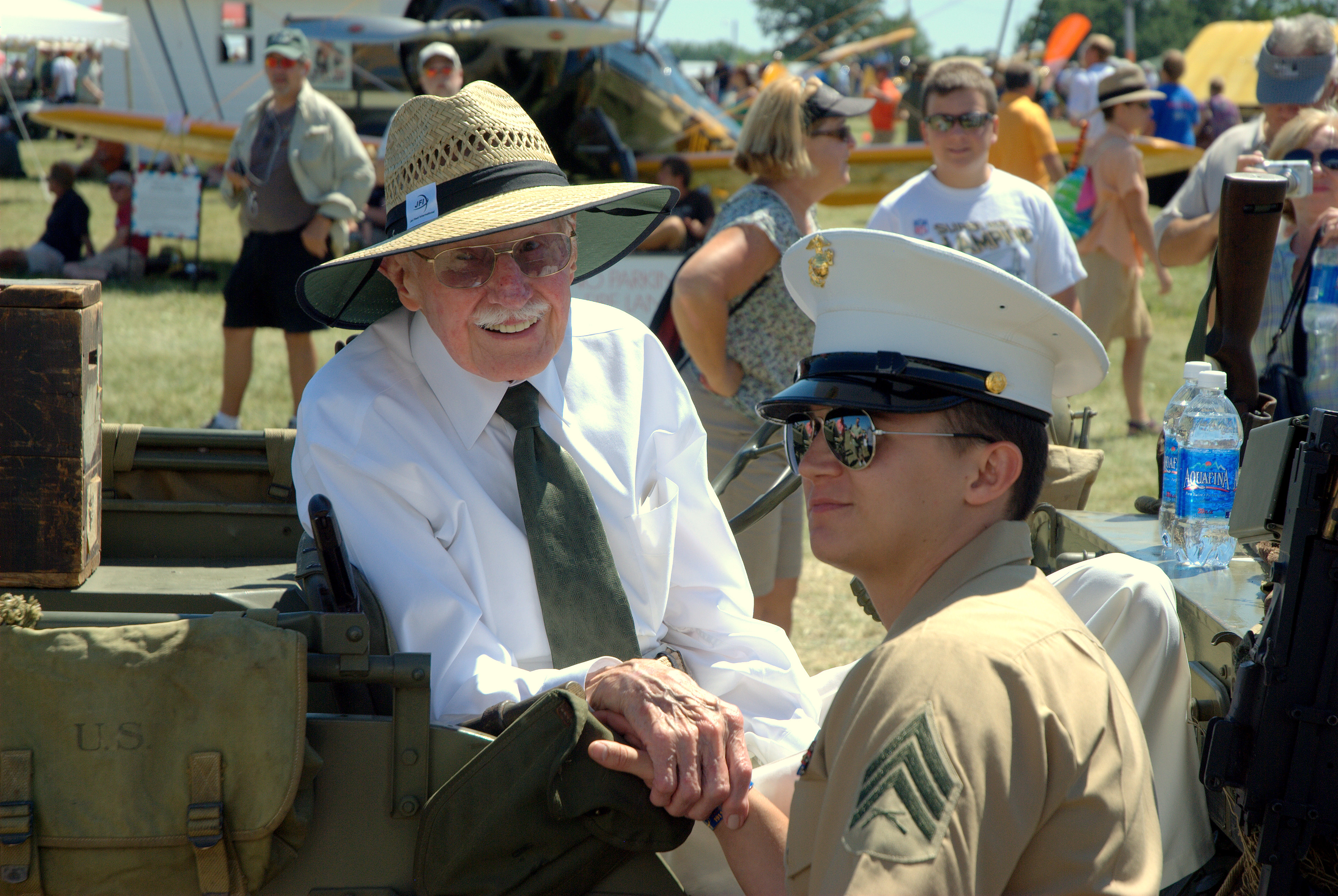
Bob Hoover meeting vet at EAA AirVenture Oshkosh in 2011

Hoover was considered one of the founding fathers of modern aerobatics and was described by General Jimmy Doolittle as "the greatest stick-and-rudder man who ever lived". In the 2003 Centennial of Flight edition of Air & Space/Smithsonian, he was named the third greatest aviator in history.

During his career, Hoover was awarded the following military medals: the Distinguished Flying Cross, the Soldier's Medal for non-combat valor, the Air Medal with several oak leaf clusters, the Purple Heart and the French Croix de Guerre. He was also made an honorary member of the United States Navy aerobatic team the Blue Angels, the United States Air Force Thunderbirds, the Canadian Forces Snowbirds, the American Fighter Aces Association and the original Eagle Squadron, and received an Award of Merit from the American Fighter Pilots Association. He was inducted into the National Aviation Hall of Fame in 1988 and to the Aerospace Walk of Honor in 1992.

Hoover received the Living Legends of Aviation Freedom of Flight Award in 2006, which was renamed the Bob Hoover Freedom of Flight Award the following year. In 2007, he received the Smithsonian's National Air and Space Museum Trophy and was inducted into the International Air & Space Hall of Fame at the San Diego Air & Space Museum.

On May 18, 2010, Hoover delivered the 2010 Charles A. Lindbergh Memorial Lecture at the Smithsonian Institution's National Air and Space Museum in Washington, D.C. The U.S. Air Force Test Pilot School conferred an honorary doctorate on Hoover at the school's December 2010 graduation ceremony. Flying magazine placed Hoover number 10 on its list of "The 51 Heroes of Aviation" in 2013.

On December 12, 2014, at the Aero Club of Washington's 67th annual Wright Memorial Dinner, Hoover was awarded the National Aeronautic Association's Wright Brothers Memorial Trophy.

The AOPA R.A. "Bob" Hoover Trophy is named in honor of him, and awarded to those who have demonstrated the airmanship, leadership, and passion that Hoover did during his career and life. The Bob Hoover Academy was also named after him, which was founded by Sean Tucker in 2017 and acts as a charitable education and aviation program for at-risk teens, largely backed by the local California school district and Harrison Ford.

On March 11, 2017, at the 2017 United States Air Force Academy Recognition Dinner, Hoover was announced as the Class Exemplar for the USAFA Class of 2020.

== Flying the Feathered Edge ==
Hoover's decades of revolutionary flying formed the framework for the 2014 documentary film, Flying the Feathered Edge: The Bob Hoover Project, directed by Kim Furst, which centers around Hoover's life and legacy. It was premiered at the EAA AirVenture Oshkosh convention in July 2014.

Harrison Ford and Sean Tucker frame the documentary about the aviation pioneer. The film begins with a tribute to Hoover's flying skills by Neil Armstrong and features Burt Rutan, Dick Rutan, Carroll Shelby, Gene Cernan, Medal of Honor recipient Col. George E. "Bud" Day, Clay Lacy and Hoover himself, among others.

Flying the Feathered Edge was a three-year project and tells Hoover's story from his first flying lessons before World War II to his combat and postwar careers as a test pilot and air show legend. Reporter Fred George's review in the Aviation Week Network stated, "After 90 minutes there were few dry eyes in the house as the credits rolled at the end of the documentary ... in Aviation Week's opinion, a film well worth our reader's viewing time when it appears in nearby theaters."

The official film premiere was held in August 2014 at the Veterans Memorial Auditorium in Providence, Rhode Island during the Rhode Island International Film Festival, winning the Grand Prize "Soldiers and Sacrifice Award". The film received the Combs Gates Award from the National Aviation Hall of Fame in 2015 for "excellence in preserving aerospace history".

== Hoover nozzle and Hoover ring ==
The "Hoover nozzle", used on refueling equipment dispensing jet fuel, is designed with a flattened bell shape. It cannot be inserted in the filler neck of a gasoline-powered aircraft with the "Hoover ring" installed, thus preventing the tank from accidentally being filled with jet fuel.

This system was given this name following an accident in which Hoover was seriously injured, when both engines on his Shrike Commander failed during takeoff. Investigators found that the aircraft had just been fueled by line personnel who mistook the piston-engine Shrike for a similar turboprop model, filling the tanks with jet fuel instead of avgas (aviation gasoline). There was enough avgas in the fuel system for the aircraft to taxi to the runway and take off, but then the jet fuel was drawn into the engines, causing them to stop.

Once Hoover recovered, he widely promoted the use of the new type of nozzle with the support and funding of the National Air Transportation Association, the General Aviation Manufacturers Association and various other aviation groups. The nozzle is now required on jet fuel dispensing equipment in the United States by federal government regulation.

== See also ==
- List of aviators
- List of prisoners of war
- Society of Experimental Test Pilots
