= Feature group =

Term used in telephony

A feature group, in North American telephone industry jargon, is most commonly used to designate various standard means of access by callers to competitive long-distance services. They defined switching arrangements from local exchange carriers central offices to interexchange carriers. These arrangements were described in Tariff No. 5 of the National Exchange Carrier Association, filed on 25 October, 1991 with the Federal Communications Commission (FCC).

== Feature groups ==
While there are other feature groups for local access, the four common feature groups exist for access from the local subscriber to competitive long-distance carriers.

=== Feature Group A ===
The original implementation, in which a user has to dial the local telephone number of a provider's gateway, followed by (usually) a password, then the desired long-distance number. There is a different local access number in each local calling area. This requires no special capability at the local telephone company office as competing long-distance providers connected using standard local lines, which may or may not support caller ID. If a carrier has no local presence, a foreign exchange line is used to reach its nearest point of presence. Once the standard means of accessing alternate long-distance carriers, local access numbers are now used primarily for low-cost prepaid calling cards as the calls may be made from any phone, at flat or local rates.

=== Feature Group B ===
Associated with 950-XXXX calling; instead of a local telephone number the user enters 950 and 4 additional digits which identify the long-distance carrier. Operation is similar to the local access numbers (feature group A) except that the 950-XXXX access number is the same in every community, NANP-wide. Some exchanges send the caller's number automatically; where this service is not provided or not desired (calling card applications), the 950-XXXX number must be followed by a calling card number and the long-distance destination number. If ANI is provided, calls from the one subscribed line may be made as 950-XXXX and the long-distance destination. Largely deprecated by feature group D, but the 950 prefix and a list of carrier codes remain reserved in all North American area codes, even in Canada where most providers went from feature group A directly to 1+ default carrier dialling and feature group D (101xxxx + destination) calling without ever using 950-XXXX as a primary means to access alternate long-distance carriers from home land lines.

=== Feature Group C ===
Rare, originally used by AT&T for operator-assisted coin phones since they allow the operator to keep control of the caller's telephone line until the transaction is completed. As coin-handling for trunk calls is now automated within the phone (like a COCOT, the current generation of coin phones operates self-contained without the central exchange providing coin-call support functions), group 'C' is largely obsolete.

=== Feature Group D ===
The current standard, requires the local switch support equal access by competing carriers at the trunk level; highest quality connection, and allows pre-selection of the interexchange carrier by the end-user. This feature group permits two types of calls. If a user dials 1 + area code + seven-digit number, the long-distance call is handled by a default carrier chosen by the user. Alternatively, a user dials 101 + four-digit carrier code + area code + seven-digit number, and the call is handled by the carrier specified by the carrier code. The original batch of carrier codes were three-digit, and began with dialing 10; when eventual exhaust became apparent, the instructions changed to represent it as "dial-around" 1010-xxx service; after an extended permissive period, 10+xxx ceased to function, and now functions as 101+xxxx, with the second zero migrated to turn the original three-digit codes into four-digit codes starting with zero; new codes were assigned with other numbers as the first of four digits. NANPA maintains separate lists of carrier codes for feature groups 'B' and 'D' as not all long-distance providers support both standards.

These alternative groups allowed the LEC's end users to make long-distance calls using the interexchange carrier's network, when non-stored program-controlled exchanges could not be modified to provide equal access. By the mid 1990s, Equal Access features in exchange software had rendered Feature Group D universally available in modern landline exchanges; the others are either used for calling card applications or are obsolete.
