= Interexchange carrier =

Type of telecommunication company

An interexchange carrier (IXC), in U.S. legal and regulatory terminology, is a type of telecommunications company, commonly called a long-distance telephone company. It is defined as any carrier that provides services across multiple local access and transport areas (interLATA). Calls made on telephone circuits within the local geographic area covered by one local network are handled only by that intraLATA carrier, commonly called a local telephone exchange carrier. Local calls are usually defined by connections made without additional charge whether the connected call is in the same LATA or connects to another LATA with no charge. IntraLATA usually refers to rated or toll calls between LATA within state boundaries, as opposed to interstate, or calls between LATAs in different states.

== Call handling ==
An interexchange carrier handles traffic between telephone exchanges. Telephone exchanges are identified in the United States by the three-digit area code (NPA) and the central office prefix, which is the first three digits of the local telephone number (NPA-NXX). Different exchanges, or central offices, generally serve different geographic areas.

For voice traffic transfer, IXCs use Tandem switches and SS7 signaling or softswitches and VoIP protocols and error correction ITSPs can thereby connect between VoIP to POTS, computer to computer, computer to phone, and Internet Protocol devices to other phone services.

== Carrier identification code ==
Each carrier (interexchange or local exchange) is assigned a four-digit identification code, the carrier identification code (CIC) which was used with feature groups. The interexchange carrier to which calls from a subscriber line are routed by default is known as the presubscribed interexchange carrier (PIC). To give telephone users the possibility of opting for a different carrier on a call-by-call basis, carrier access codes (CAC) were devised. These consist of the digits 101 followed by the four-digit CIC. The CAC is dialed as a prefix immediately before dialing a long-distance telephone number.

In popular usage, CACs are often referred to as dial-around codes, because they allow "dialing around" the PIC. Sometimes they are even called "PIC codes", though this term is inaccurate, since the code is being used to avoid the PIC, not to use its services.

When CICs were introduced in 1983, they were only three digits long, and the CAC consisted of the digits 10 followed by the three-digit CIC. In 1998, the CIC had to be extended to four digits. Existing carriers' codes were prefixed with 10. Thus, a pre-1998 CAC of the form 10-XXX became 101-0XXX. Since the CACs starting with 10-10 are generally the oldest and best-known ones, CACs are sometimes referred to as 10-10 codes.

== See also ==
- 10-10-321/10-10-220
- Long-distance calling
- Telephone slamming
