= 1-800-COLLECT =

Phone number used for reverse charge calls

- 1-800-COLLECT logo as of 2001
- Product type: Collect calling
- Current owner: WiMacTel
- Country: Canada; United States
- Introduced: 1993
- Markets: United States; Canada
- Previous owners: Telecom USA
- Tagline: "Save a Buck or Two" (1990s)

1-800-COLLECT (1-800-265-5328) is a 1-800 number, owned and operated by WiMacTel, which provides fixed rate collect calling in the United States. The service was launched by MCI in 1993.

== History ==
=== Launch ===
Prior to 1993, collect calling was a virtual monopoly held by AT&T as people were accustomed to dialing "0" to place collect calls. MCI moved aggressively to insert itself into the market by launching 1-800-COLLECT that year. By dialing 1-800-COLLECT, customers could connect with an automated MCI system which would directly place a call to a designated receiving party for a fraction of the cost of the AT&T service for its operator-assisted collect calling. According to Advertising Age, 1-800-COLLECT went from concept to launch in less than three months. Launched with a large marketing budget, within a year New York Magazine reported that MCI had "stamped 1-800-COLLECT onto our consciousness with a mammoth marketing blitz" aimed largely at Generation X consumers.

=== Competition ===
Following the successful launch of 1-800-COLLECT, AT&T responded with a competing 1-800 phone number providing discounted collect calling, 1-800-OPERATOR. However, a significant portion of calls intended for 1-800-OPERATOR misspelled "Operator" as "Operater". The numerical translation for 1-800-OPERATER (1-800-673-7283) was, at the time, assigned for routing to the MCI network, which capitalized on the large number of spelling errors by connecting those calls to 1-800-COLLECT. After several months, AT&T realized they were inadvertently directing a portion of their business to MCI and terminated the 1-800-OPERATOR service, replacing it with 1-800-CALL-ATT. The local telephone companies, who lost a significant amount of business to both numbers, started fighting back with ads showing how much simpler it was to just dial 0 (Ameritech's ad said "Why push 800 numbers when you can just push one?") or later advertising calling cards as an alternative to calling someone collect.

=== Later years ===
By the time of MCI's bankruptcy in 2002, its 1-800-COLLECT business had fallen precipitously due to the growing market penetration of mobile phones and the decreasing popularity of pay phones, which had generated a large portion of the collect calling business. After MCI was acquired by Verizon following the bankruptcy, the 1-800-COLLECT business was transferred to a small Verizon subsidiary, Telecom USA. Though the service's robust advertising budget was terminated, it continued to receive a trickle of business. In 2014 one caller, who "still associated the 1-800-COLLECT number with reasonable collect call rates... so strong were the company's early ads", reported being charged $42.55 for a six-minute telephone call. On November 1, 2016 Viiz Communications, a Canadian company, announced they had acquired 1-800-COLLECT for an undisclosed amount.

== Marketing ==
1-800-COLLECT advertising did not mention its connection to MCI in order to avoid confusion from persons who might otherwise believe they had to be MCI customers to use the service, as well as to attract AT&T "loyalists" disinclined to patronize an MCI service.

In 1994, 1-800-COLLECT became one of the first six brands to use banner ads as part of a marketing campaign, purchasing a flight of ads on hotwired.com.

Beginning in 1994, MCI sponsored airshow pilot Sean D. Tucker under the 1-800-COLLECT brand. Tucker's biplane regularly appeared at military and civilian airshows throughout North America for several years, later transitioning to the 10-10-220 brand under MCI until the program ended in 2000.

The service's heavy spend on television advertising made 1-800-COLLECT ads, which featured celebrities including Phil Hartman, Wayne Knight, Mr. T, and Arsenio Hall, a ubiquitous feature of the 1990s TV landscape in the United States. In 2000, 1-800-COLLECT was being promoted with more than $160 million in annual advertising support by MCI. Steve Burns, best known as the first host of the children's television show Blue's Clues served as an announcer for the ads.
