= 10-10-321 =

American long-distance telephone service

10-10-321, 10-10-345, 10-10-220, and 10-10-987 are United States long-distance phone services best known for their prolific television and direct mail advertising in the late 1990s. 10-10-321 was the first mass-marketed service of its type. 10-10-345 was owned by AT&T, and the rest were all owned by MCI, which became part of Verizon. All services of its kind are known as interexchange carriers, which essentially allow consumers to bypass, or "dial-around" their primary long-distance carrier and use a different one.

== History ==
The services debuted in May 1996, originally as 10-321 before the telephone industry expanded carrier access codes to seven digits instead of the original five; the number gained an additional "10", becoming 10-10-321 on July 1, 1998. Although "dial-around" interexchange carriers existed prior to the debut of 10-10-321, these were among the first to feature a mass multimedia advertising campaign.

The services were advertised heavily, using celebrities such as Hulk Hogan, ALF, John Lithgow, Terry Bradshaw, Reginald VelJohnson, John Stamos, Mike Piazza, Tony Danza, Doug Flutie, James Garner, Toby Keith, Christopher Lloyd, Dennis Miller and George Carlin. A Latino version featured the variant number 10-10-123 with the slogan "Diez Diez Uno Dos Tres". This ubiquitous presence on television led to a spill-over into pop culture for a brief time, much like 1-800-COLLECT, a collect call service also owned by MCI, during this era. Each service advertised rates that were significantly lower than most telephone operators were charging at the time; 10-10-321, for instance, was a straight pay-per-minute service charging 10 cents per minute, while 10-10-220 was mostly a pay-per-call service, with any call up to 20 minutes charged a flat 99 cents, and both services charged the same rate regardless of time of day, a rarity for long-distance service at the time.

By the early 2000s, the steep discounts were no longer offered, rates increased as much as 80 percent in fall 2002, with 10-10-321 going from 10 cents a minute to 18 cents on October 1, 2002. A year earlier, a 9.9 percent "Universal Service Fund" charge had been added.

The widely increased use of mobile phones in the early 2000s, and subsequent decline in the use of landline phones, has rendered the service largely obsolete.

10-10-321, 10-10-220, and other 10-10 services are still available, although at significantly higher prices than originally advertised during its heyday. As of June 2022, 10-10-321 charges a flat 30¢ per minute for calls within the U.S. and U.S. territories, while 10-10-220 calls within the U.S. (except calls from Alaska, where the service is not available) cost $1.50 for the first 10 minutes, and 25¢ for each additional minute, plus a 24.4% Federal Universal Service Fee.

== See also ==
- Interexchange carrier
- Long-distance calling
