= Bud Day =

United States Air Force Medal of Honor recipient (1925–2013)

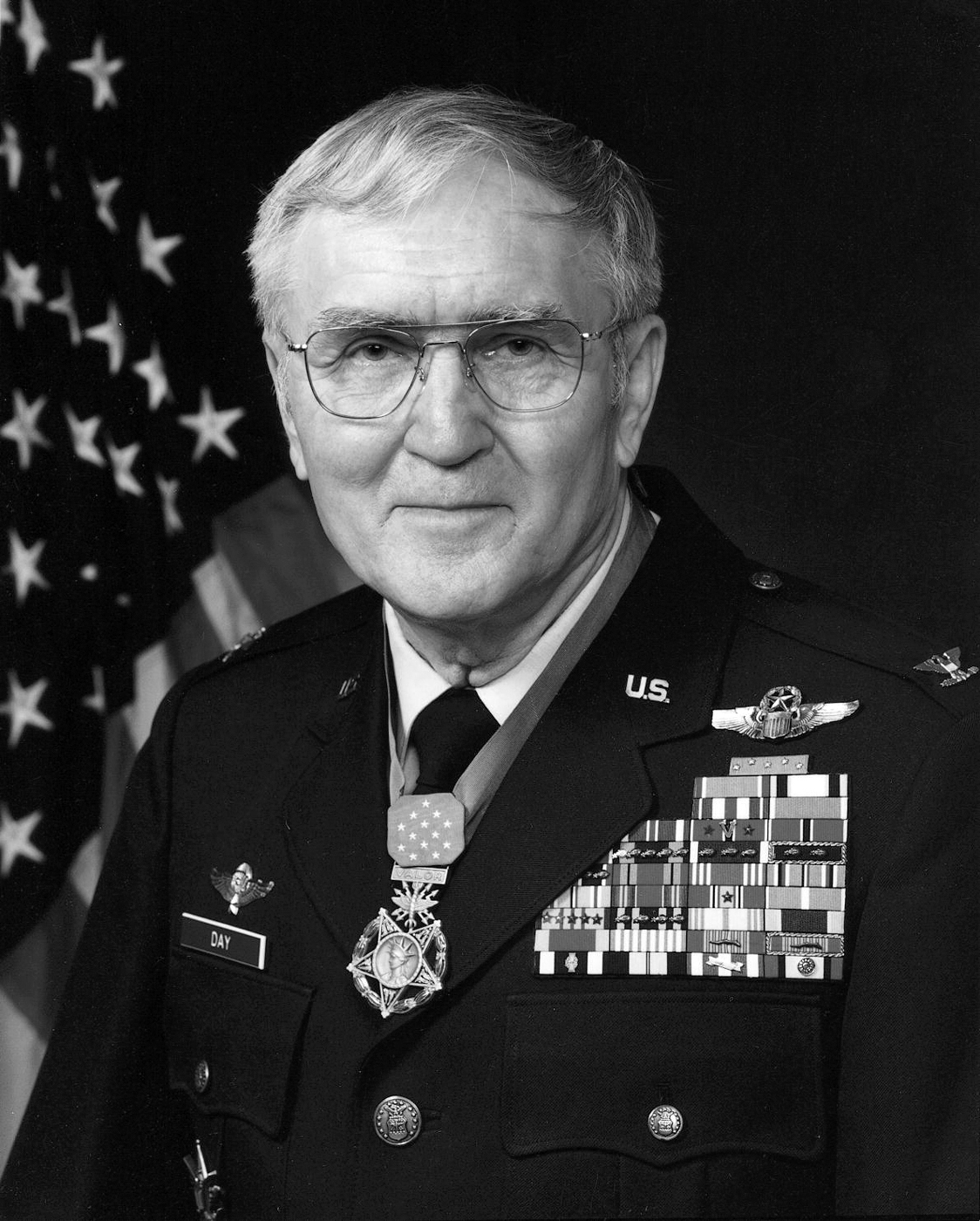
- Colonel (later Brigadier General) Bud Day
- Born: George Everette Day; February 24, 1925; Sioux City, Iowa, U.S.
- Died: July 27, 2013 (aged 88); Fort Walton Beach, Florida, U.S.
- Burial place: Barrancas National Cemetery, Pensacola, Florida, U.S.
- Military career
- Allegiance: United States
- Branch: United States Marine Corps (1942–45); United States Army (1946–49); Iowa Air National Guard (1950–55); United States Air Force (1955–77)
- Service years: 1942–1977
- Rank: Colonel; Brigadier General (posthumous)
- Nickname: Bud
- Units: 33rd Fighter Wing; 55th Fighter Bomber Squadron; 559th Strategic Fighter Squadron; 3d Light Antiaircraft Missile Battalion
- Commands: 416th Fighter Squadron
- Conflicts: World War II; Korean War; Vietnam War
- Awards: Medal of Honor; Air Force Cross; Air Force Distinguished Service Medal; Silver Star; Legion of Merit (2); Distinguished Flying Cross; Bronze Star Medal (4, 3 with "V" device); Purple Heart (4); Full list
- Other work: Author, Return with Honor; Partner, Day and Meade (law firm)

George Everette "Bud" Day (24 February 1925 – 27 July 2013) was a United States Air Force officer, aviator, and veteran of World War II, Korean War and Vietnam War. He was also a prisoner of war, and recipient of the Medal of Honor and Air Force Cross. As of 2025, he is the only person to be awarded both the Medal of Honor and Air Force Cross. He was posthumously advanced to the rank of brigadier general effective March 27, 2018, as directed by the 2017 National Defense Authorization Act.

Day's actions from 26 August 1967 through 14 March 1973 were the last to earn the Medal of Honor prior to the end of U.S. involvement in the Vietnam War on 30 April 1975, though some honorees (e.g. Leslie H. Sabo Jr., honored on 16 May 2012) were cited for their medals after Day's recognition on 4 March 1976. Having earned over 70 awards, decorations, and medals, Day is considered to be the most decorated United States military officer since Douglas MacArthur.

== Early life and education ==
Day was born in Sioux City, Iowa, on 24 February 1925. In 1942 he dropped out of Central High School and enlisted in the United States Marine Corps (USMC).

After the war, Day attended Morningside College on the G.I. Bill, earning a Bachelor of Science degree, followed by law school at the University of South Dakota School of Law, receiving a Juris Doctor. Day passed the bar exam in 1949 and was admitted to the bar in South Dakota. In later life, Day was also awarded a Master of Arts degree from Saint Louis University, a doctor of humane letters from Morningside, and a doctor of laws from Troy State University. Day was admitted to the Florida Bar in 1977.

== Military career ==
Enlisting in the USMC on 10 December 1942, Day served 30 months in the North Pacific during World War II as a member of a 5-inch gun battery with the 3rd Defense Battalion on Johnston Island, but he never saw combat. He was discharged (the first time) on 24 November 1945.

On 11 December 1946, Day joined the Army Reserve, serving until 10 December 1949. On 17 May 1950, Day received a direct commission as a second lieutenant in the Iowa Air National Guard. He was called to active duty on 15 March 1951 for undergraduate pilot training in the U.S. Air Force. He was awarded his pilot wings at Webb Air Force Base, Texas, in September 1952, continuing through December 1952 in All-Weather Interceptor School and Gunnery School.

From February 1953 to August 1955 during the Korean War, Day served two tours as a fighter-bomber pilot, flying the Republic F-84 Thunderjet in the 559th Strategic Fighter Squadron. Promoted to captain, he decided to make the Air Force a career and was augmented into the Regular Air Force. He was next assigned to the 55th Fighter Bomber Squadron and trained to fly the F-100 Super Sabre in 1957 while stationed at Royal Air Force Wethersfield in the United Kingdom through June 1959. During this time he was forced to bail out when his jet fighter caught fire. His parachute canopy failed to blossom, making him the first person to live through such an event. According to Day, a 30-foot (9.1 m) pine tree cushioned his fall.

Day was Assistant Professor of Aerospace Science at the Air Force ROTC detachment at Saint Louis University in St. Louis, Missouri, from June 1959 to August 1963.

Anticipating retirement in 1968 and now a major, Day volunteered for a tour in South Vietnam and was assigned to the 31st Tactical Fighter Wing at Tuy Hoa Air Base in April 1967. At that time, he had more than 5,000 flying hours, with 4,500 of them in fighters. On 25 June 1967, with extensive previous service flying two tours in F-100s, Major Day was made the first commander of Detachment 1, 416th Tactical Fighter Squadron, 37th Tactical Fighter Wing based at Phu Cat Air Base. Under the project name Commando Sabre, twin-seat USAF F-100Fs were evaluated as a Fast Forward Air Controller (Fast FAC) aircraft in high threat areas, given that F-4 Phantom II aircraft were in high demand for strike and Combat Air Patrol (CAP) roles. Using the call sign Misty, the name of Day's favorite song, his detachment of four two-seat F-100Fs and 16 pilots became pioneer "Fast FACs" over Laos and North Vietnam. All Misty FAC crews were volunteers with at least 100 combat missions in Vietnam and 1,000 minimum flight hours. Tours in Commando Sabre were temporary and normally limited to four months or about 60 missions.

=== Prisoner of war ===
On 26 August 1967, Major Day was flying F-100F-15-NA, AF Serial No. 56-3954, call sign Misty 01, on his 26th Fast FAC sortie, directing a flight of F-105 Thunderchiefs in an air strike against a surface-to-air missile (SAM) site north of Thon Cam Son and west of Đồng Hới, 20 mi (32 km) north of the DMZ in North Vietnam. Day was on his 65th mission into North Vietnam and acting as check pilot for Captain Corwin M. "Kipp" Kippenhan, who was upgrading to aircraft commander. 37 mm antiaircraft fire crippled the aircraft, forcing the crew to eject. In the ejection, Day's right arm was broken in three places when he struck the side of the cockpit, and he also received eye and back injuries.

Kippenhan was rescued by a USAF HH-3E, but Day was unable to contact the rescue helicopter by survival radio and was quickly captured by North Vietnamese local militia. On his fifth night, when he was still within 20 miles (32 kilometers) of the DMZ, Day escaped from his initial captors despite his serious injuries. Although stripped of both his boots and flight suit, Day crossed the DMZ back into South Vietnam. Within 2 miles (3 kilometers) of the U.S. Marine firebase at Con Thien and after 12 to 15 days of evading, he was captured again, this time by a Viet Cong patrol that wounded him in the leg and hand with gunfire.

Taken back to his original camp, Day was tortured for escaping, breaking his right arm again. He then was moved to several prison camps near Hanoi, where he was periodically beaten, starved, and tortured. In December 1967, Day shared a cell with Navy Lieutenant Commander and future senator and presidential candidate John McCain. Air Force Major Norris Overly nursed both back to health, and McCain later devised a makeshift splint of bamboo and rags that helped heal Day's seriously atrophied arm.

On 14 March 1973, Day was released after five years and seven months as a North Vietnamese prisoner. Within three days Day was reunited with his wife, Doris Sorensen Day, and four children at March Air Force Base, California. On 4 March 1976, President Gerald Ford awarded Day the Medal of Honor for his personal bravery while a captive in North Vietnam.

Day had been promoted to lieutenant colonel and then to colonel while a prisoner, and he decided to remain in the Air Force in hopes of being promoted to brigadier general. Although initially too weak to resume operational flying, he spent a year in physical rehabilitation and with 13 separate medical waivers, he was returned to active flying status. He underwent conversion training to the F-4 Phantom II and was appointed vice commander of the 33rd Tactical Fighter Wing at Eglin Air Force Base, Florida.

Day, in 2008, said of his imprisonment, "As awful as it sounds, no one could say we did not do well. ...[Being a POW] was a major issue in my life and one that I am extremely proud of. I was just living day to day. One bad cold and I would have been dead."

=== Retirement ===
After being passed over for nomination to brigadier general, Day retired from active duty in 1977 to resume practicing law in Florida. At his retirement he had nearly 8,000 total flying hours, 4,900 in single-engine jets, and had flown the F-80 Shooting Star, F-84 Thunderjet, F-100 Super Sabre, F-101 Voodoo, F-104 Starfighter, F-105 Thunderchief, F-106 Delta Dart, FB-111, F-4 Phantom II, A-4 Skyhawk, A-7 Corsair II, CF-5 Tiger, F-16, and F-15 Eagle jet fighters.

Following his retirement, Day wrote an autobiographical account of his experiences as a prisoner of war, Return with Honor, followed by Duty, Honor, Country, which updated his autobiography to include his post-Air Force years. Among other endeavors, in 1996 Day filed a class action lawsuit for breach of contract against the United States government on behalf of military retirees who were stripped of their promised free lifetime military medical care benefits at age 65 and told to pay for Medicare. Although winning the case in the district court in 2001, the judgment against the U.S. was overturned by the U.S. Court of Appeals in 2002. Congress later redressed this situation by establishing the TRICARE for Life (TFL) program, which restored TRICARE military medical benefits for retired military retirees over the age of 65. However, Medicare became the primary payer with TRICARE as the secondary payer. Retirees would be required to pay for Medicare in order to retain Tricare supplemental coverage.

=== Posthumous advancement of rank ===
Day was posthumously advanced to the rank of brigadier general during a Heritage to Horizons summer concert series at the Air Force Memorial in Arlington, Virginia, on June 8, 2018. The ceremony was presided over by the Chief of Staff of the Air Force, General David L. Goldfein, and attended by his widow, Doris Day. The posthumous advancement of Day was introduced by former prisoner of war cell mate John McCain and was directed by the 2017 National Defense Authorization Act. The rank advancement was effective from March 27, 2018.

== Political activity and controversy ==
Day was an active member of the Florida Republican Party, was involved in the 527 group Swift Vets and POWs for Truth, and campaigned with John McCain in 2000 and 2008. In the months leading up to the 2004 U.S. presidential election, Day appeared in television advertisements—along with other members of the 527 group Swift Vets and POWs for Truth—decrying John Kerry's antiwar activities following his military service during the Vietnam War and declaring him "unfit" for service and of a "dishonest" disposition for comments and actions made by Kerry after the Vietnam War, including his testimony before Congress in Washington, D.C. During a 2008 teleconference with reporters from the Miami Herald, Day made comments regarding John McCain's stance on the Iraq War, stating that "I don't intend to kneel, and I don't advocate to anybody that we kneel, and John [McCain] doesn't advocate to anybody that we kneel." Also during this interview he sparked controversy by making a broad generalization about what some saw as an ideological divide between Islam and America: "The Muslims have said either we kneel, or they're going to kill us." In the same interview when questioned about the role of 527 organizations in contemporary American politics, particularly his work for the Swift Boat Veterans for Truth, Day stated "the bottom line is this: 527 groups can do very effective, truthful things, and the Swift Boat attack was totally truthful."

== Personal life and death ==
Day lived in Shalimar, Florida. In 1949, he married Doris (1929-2025). He had 14 grandchildren and was a member of the Lutheran Church–Missouri Synod.

Day died on 27 July 2013 surrounded by family at his home in Shalimar. He was buried on August 1 at Barrancas National Cemetery at NAS Pensacola, Florida, U.S.

John McCain, Day's prisoner-of-war cellmate, said on Day's death, "He was the bravest man I ever knew, and his fierce resistance and resolute leadership set the example for us in prison of how to return home with honor."

== Honors ==
A number of structures have been named after Day. On 14 March 1997, the new Survival School Building at Fairchild Air Force Base, Washington, was named in his honor. In 2002 the Sioux City, Iowa, airport was renamed Sioux Gateway Airport/Colonel Bud Day Field. On 7 May 2010, Day Manor, a visiting officers quarters (VOQ) at Goodfellow Air Force Base, Texas, was dedicated in his honor. A section of State Road 397 just outside Eglin Air Force Base was named Col. Bud Day Boulevard on 12 October 2010.

In May 2014, Florida's state legislature designated the U.S. Highway 98 overpass in front of the Hurlburt Field main gate "Colonel Bud Day Overpass."

On 4 January 2008 Day was awarded the Freedom Communications Spirit of Freedom Award on behalf of the Northwest Florida Daily News.

On 15 March 2014, he was named the class exemplar for the Class of 2017 at the United States Air Force Academy. Day was chosen for this honor because of his embracing of the Air Force Core Values: integrity first, service before self, excellence in all we do.

It was announced Day will be inducted into the National Aviation Hall of Fame on October 1, 2016, in Dayton, Ohio.

A road in the city of Sikeston, Missouri is named after Day. The original name was Col. George E. Day Pkwy but was revised, after his posthumous advancement, to Gen. George E. Day Pkwy.

As of 2025 Day was the only person ever to have been awarded both the Medal of Honor and the Air Force Cross. He is widely considered to be the most-decorated airman in history.

=== Medal of Honor citation ===
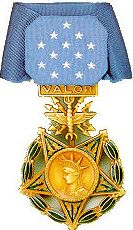
Air Force version of the Medal of Honor

Rank and organization: Colonel (then Major), U.S. Air Force, Forward Air Controller Pilot of an F-100 aircraft.

Place and date: North Vietnam, 26 August 1967.
Entered service at: Sioux City, Iowa.
Born: February 24, 1925, Sioux City, Iowa.
General Orders: GB-180, 22 March 1976

Citation: On 26 August 1967, Colonel Day was forced to eject from his aircraft over North Vietnam when it was hit by ground fire. His right arm was broken in 3 places, and his left knee was badly sprained. He was immediately captured by hostile forces and taken to a prison camp where he was interrogated and severely tortured. After causing the guards to relax their vigilance, Col. Day escaped into the jungle and began the trek toward South Vietnam. Despite injuries inflicted by fragments of a bomb or rocket, he continued southward surviving only on a few berries and uncooked frogs. He successfully evaded enemy patrols and reached the Bến Hải River, where he encountered U.S. artillery barrages. With the aid of a bamboo log float, Col. Day swam across the river and entered the demilitarized zone. Due to delirium, he lost his sense of direction and wandered aimlessly for several days. After several unsuccessful attempts to signal U.S. aircraft, he was ambushed and recaptured by the Viet Cong, sustaining gunshot wounds to his left hand and thigh. He was returned to the prison from which he had escaped and later was moved to Hanoi after giving his captors false information to questions put before him. Physically, Col. Day was totally debilitated and unable to perform even the simplest task for himself. Despite his many injuries, he continued to offer maximum resistance. His personal bravery in the face of deadly enemy pressure was significant in saving the lives of fellow aviators who were still flying against the enemy. Col. Day's conspicuous gallantry and intrepidity at the risk of his life above and beyond the call of duty are in keeping with the highest traditions of the U.S. Air Force and reflect great credit upon himself and the U.S. Armed Forces.

=== Air Force Cross citation ===
The Air Force Cross is presented to George Everett Day, Colonel, United States Air Force, for extraordinary heroism in military operations against an opposing armed force as a Prisoner of War in North Vietnam from 16 July 1969 to 14 October 1969. During this period, Colonel Day was subjected to maximum punishment and torture by Vietnamese guards to obtain a detailed confession of escape plans, policies, and orders of the American senior ranking officer in the camp, and the communications methods used by the Americans interned in the camp. Colonel Day withstood this punishment and gave nothing of value to the Vietnamese, although he sustained many injuries and open wounds to his body. Through his extraordinary heroism and willpower, in the face of the enemy, Colonel Day reflected the highest credit upon himself and the United States Air Force.
General Orders: Department of the Air Force, Special Orders GB-1152, (October 29, 1974)

== Badges and awards ==

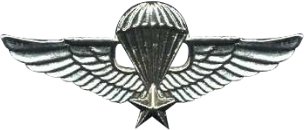

US Air Force Command Pilot Badge
Medal of Honor	Air Force Cross		Air Force Distinguished Service Medal
Silver Star	Legion of Merit with oak leaf cluster	Distinguished Flying Cross	Bronze Star Medal with Valor device and three bronze oak leaf clusters (3 awards for Valor)
Purple Heart with three bronze oak leaf clusters	Defense Meritorious Service Medal	Air Medal with silver and four bronze oak leaf clusters	Air Force Presidential Unit Citation with two bronze oak leaf clusters
Air Force Outstanding Unit Award with Valor device and three bronze oak leaf clusters	Prisoner of War Medal	Combat Readiness Medal	Army Good Conduct Medal
Marine Corps Good Conduct Medal	American Campaign Medal	Asiatic-Pacific Campaign Medal with two bronze stars	World War II Victory Medal
National Defense Service Medal with bronze service star	Korean Service Medal	Vietnam Service Medal with two silver and four bronze service stars	Air Force Longevity Service Award with four oak leaf clusters
Armed Forces Reserve Medal	Small Arms Expert Marksmanship Ribbon	China War Memorial Medal	National Order of Vietnam, Knight
Vietnam Gallantry Cross with palm	Vietnam Psychological Warfare Medal 1st Class	Vietnam Veteran's Medal 1st Class	Vietnam Gallantry Cross Unit Award
United Nations Korea Medal	Vietnam Campaign Medal	Republic of Korea War Service Medal	Medal of Valor, Iowa Air National Guard
Vietnam Master Parachutist Badge

- Plus, Brig Gen Day was wearing one unidentified badge on his right pocket.

== See also ==
- List of Medal of Honor recipients for the Vietnam War
