= 5-inch gun =

A 5-inch gun is a gun with a 5-inch bore. Examples include these naval weapons:

- BL 5 inch gun Mk I – V British naval and coast defence guns of 1880s-1890s
- 5-inch gun M1897 and M1900 - US Army coast artillery weapons 1900-1920
- 5"/25 caliber US anti-aircraft gun
- 5"/40 caliber gun - USN gun
- 5"/50 caliber gun - USN gun
- 5"/51 caliber US anti-ship gun
- 5"/38 caliber US dual-purpose gun
- 5"/54 caliber Mark 42 gun US dual-purpose gun
- 5"/54 caliber Mark 45 gun US (and 5"/62 caliber Mark 45 Model 4 gun)
- Oto Melara 127/54C dual-purpose gun Italian naval gun
- Oto Melara 127/64 dual-purpose gun Italian naval gun
