= Living Legends of Aviation =

Aerospace award

- Formation: December 17, 2003
- Founder: Jerry Lips
- Type: 501(c)(3) nonprofit
- Purpose: Recognition of Aviation and Aerospace Achievements
- Members: c. 131
- Executive Director: Jerry Lips (2016)
- Parent organization: Kiddie Hawk Air Academy
- Website: livinglegendsofaviation.org

The Living Legends of Aviation is an organization that recognizes accomplished people in aviation and aerospace including entrepreneurs, innovators, industry leaders, engineers, astronauts, record breakers, pilots who have become celebrities and celebrities who have become pilots. The Living Legends meet yearly in North America at The Beverly Hilton and in Europe every-other-year at the Scalaria Resort at a 15th-century castle on the Wolfgangsee near Salzburg, Austria. Inductees and Awards are selected by the Living Legends of Aviation and by committees within the organization. The awards are produced by and benefit the Kiddie Hawk Air Academy, a non-profit 501(c)(3).

The 23rd Annual Living Legends of Aviation Awards, honoring the best in aviation and aerospace for 2025, was held on January 23, 2026, at The Beverly Hilton Hotel in Beverly Hills, California, where they have been held annually since 2007.

The 5th European Living Legends of Aviation Awards was held September 4th - 6th, 2026 at Scalaria, Austria.

== History ==
Jerry Lips, publisher of Airport Journals, came up with the idea of the Living Legends of Aviation at the time of the death of Michael Chowdry (founder of Atlas Air). Airport Journals had been collecting and publishing biographies of various aviation personalities and Jerry regretted not having captured Chowdry's history. He began to compile a list of individuals that had made major contributions in the field of aviation, and had those people suggest more names until 70 were collected. These were the biographies that were to be recorded while the individuals were still "living". The list has grown over the years to its present number of 131. As Legends pass on, they are replaced by new inductees, selected by their fellow Legends.

Jerry Lips founded the Living Legends of Aviation in 2003 with the charter of celebrating the second century of aerospace. In 2008, Kiddie Hawk Air Academy acquired the rights to the organization and annual awards show from previous owner Airport Journals.

== Inductees ==
- Chuck Aaron
- George F (Rick) Adam
- James Albaugh
- Buzz Aldrin
- Mark Baker
- Brian Barents
- Laurent Beaudoin
- Péter Besenyei
- Jeff Bezos
- Tony Bill
- Linden Blue
- Ed Bolen
- Ivo Boscarol
- Maj. Gen. Patrick Brady
- Sir Richard Branson
- Pete Bunce
- Mark Burns
- Chris Cassidy
- Bin Chen
- Julie Clark
- Danny Clisham
- Eileen Collins
- Ray Conner
- Tom Cruise
- Gen. Jack Dailey
- Alvaro-Jaime de Orléans-Borbón
- Robert Dewar
- Iren Dornier
- Dan Drohan
- Bonnie Dunbar
- J. Robert Duncan
- Tom Enders
- Jack Erickson
- Alan Eustace
- Greg Evans
- Greg Feith
- Rick Fiddler
- Edsel Ford II
- Harrison Ford
- Morgan Freeman
- Michimasa Fujino
- Kenny G
- Bruno Gantenbrink
- William Garvey
- Randy Gaston
- Fred George
- Stephen Grey
- Charles Gordon-Lennox
- David Greschke
- Charles Hall
- Brenda Halvorson
- Lon Halvorson
- Tom Haines
- Preston Henne
- Greg Herrick
- Sir Stephen Hillier
- Steve Hinton
- Skip Holm
- Craig Hosking
- David Hurley
- Jared Isaacman
- Miguel Iturmendi-Copado
- Charles B. Johnson
- Michael Kendrick
- Doug King
- John King
- Martha King
- Alan Klapmeier
- Dale Klapmeier
- Dr. Stefan Klein
- Sergei Krikalev
- Clay Lacy
- Amanda Wright Lane
- Lee Lauderback
- John Leahy
- Rod Lewis
- Jerry Lips
- Kim Lundgren
- Shane Lundgren
- Robert A. Lutz
- Sheik Al Maktoum
- T. Allan McArtor
- Bruce McCaw
- Maj. Gen. Carl McNair
- Ulf Merbold
- Elon Musk
- David Neeleman
- Steve Oliver
- Suzanne Asbury Oliver
- Hans J. Ostler
- Eren Ozmen
- Fatih Ozmen
- Marc Parent
- Jack Pelton
- Ross Perot Jr.
- Thomas Pesquet
- Bertrand Piccard
- Nick Popovich
- Jeffrey Puckett
- Kenn Ricci
- Raimund Riedmann
- Si Robin
- Jean Rosanvallon
- Kurt Russell
- Burt Rutan
- Prince Sultan bin Salman Al Saud
- Richard Santulli
- Barry Schiff
- Siegfried “Blacky” Schwarz
- Craig Sincock
- Chesley Sullenberger
- Prince Harry, Duke of Sussex
- Lynn Tilton
- Aaron Tippin
- John Travolta
- Sean Tucker
- Louis Turpen
- Dieter F. Uchtdorf
- John Uczekaj
- Steven F. Udvar-Hazy
- Patty Wagstaff
- Kermit Weeks
- Mark Welsh
- Rainer Wilke
- Gregg Williams
- Martin Withers
- Daniel Wolfe
- Elie Zelouf

== Past inductees ==
- Paul Allen
- William Anders
- Bud Anderson
- Siegfried Angerer
- Neil Armstrong
- Felix Baumgartner
- Hank Beaird
- Forrest Bird
- Col. Frank Borman
- Jimmy Buffett
- Gene Cernan
- Joe Clark
- Dick Cole
- Harry Combs
- Tom Danaher
- Walter Eichhorn
- Pat Epps
- Hal Fishman
- Larry Flynn
- Steve Fossett
- Charles Gates
- Elling Halvorson
- Hamish Harding
- Milan Haven
- Alfred Haynes
- Tex Hill
- Barron Hilton
- Bob Hoover
- Dee Howard
- Herb Kelleher
- Joe Kittinger
- Niki Lauda
- Capt. James Lovell
- Bill Luckett
- George McGovern
- Roy Morgan
- Russell W. Meyer, Jr.
- John Myers
- Zoe Dell Lantis Nutter
- Robin Olds
- Arnold Palmer
- Robert E. Petersen
- Paul Poberezny
- Tom Poberezny
- Sydney Pollack
- Bob Pond
- Vern Raburn
- James D. Raisbeck
- James Ray
- Cliff Robertson
- Frank D. Robinson
- Dick Rutan
- Wally Schirra
- Carroll Shelby
- Sergei Sikorsky
- Delford Smith
- Frederick W. Smith
- Murray Smith
- Ed Swearingen
- David Thatcher
- Paul Tibbets
- Al Ueltschi
- Emily Howell Warner
- Bruce N. Whitman
- Carl M. Willams
- Sam Williams
- Treat Williams
- Chuck Yeager

== Event ==
Beginning in 2003, an awards show has been organized each year to bring together the Living Legend members for a variety of events. The awards are presented at a prestigious live ceremony, most commonly in mid January following the relevant calendar year.

In 2003, the first Living Legends of Aviation Awards were presented at a banquet dinner hosted by Airport Journals at the Centennial Airport in Englewood, Colorado. To avoid any weather related issues, in 2006 the venue was moved to Southern California and held at the Hyatt Regency Century Plaza hotel in Los Angeles. Since 2007 the Awards have been presented at The Beverly Hilton in Beverly Hills, California.

In 2018 the inaugural Living Legends of Aviation - Europe event was held on July 26, 2018 at the Scalaria hotel & resort in Salzkammergut, Austria.

In 2021 the awards show was cancelled due to the COVID-19 pandemic.

In 2025 the awards was held on April 25, 2025, postponed due to the January 2025 Southern California wildfires.

== List of winners ==
Kenn Ricci Lifetime Aviation Entrepreneur Award
Year	Winner
2003	Charles Gates
2004	Clay Lacy
2005	Steven Udvar-Hazy
2006	Al Ueltschi
2007	James D. Raisbeck
2008	Sir Richard Branson
2009	Joe Clark
2010	Delford Smith
2011	J Robert Duncan
2012	David Neeleman
2013	Frederick Smith
2014	Herb Kelleher
2016	Kenn Ricci
2017	Robert Bigelow
2018	Jeff Bezos
2019	Charles Gordon-Lennox, 11th Duke of Richmond
2019	S. Harry Robertson
2021	Craig Sincock
2021	Alexandre Couvelaire
2022	Daniel Drohan
2023	Laurans Mendelson
2023	Steve Varsano
2024	Louis Pepper
2025	George A. Antoniadis
2026	Éric Trappier

- The award was called the Lifetime Aviation Entrepreneur Award prior to 2018.

Eren Ozmen Entrepreneur of the Year Award
Year	Winner
2003	George F (Rick) Adam
2004	Joe Clark
2005	Vern Raburn
2006	Dale & Alan Klapmeier
2007	Sheikh Ahmed Bin Saeed Al Maktoum
2008	Linden Blue
2009	Elon Musk
2010	Lynn Tilton
2011	Eren & Fatih Ozmen
2012	John Uczekaj
2015	Thomas Flohr
2017	Tyson Weihs & Jason Miller
2018	Ivo Boscarol
2019	Kenny Dichter
2021	Jared Isaacman
2021	Daniel Wiegand
2022	Tim Ellis
2023	Kyle Clark
2023	Dieter Morszeck
2024	Kaye Gitibin
2024	Sir Peter Beck
2025	Steuart Walton
2025	Philipp Steinbach
2026	Daniel Metzler

- The award was called the Aviation Entrepreneur of the Year Award prior to 2011, and the Aviation Industry Entrepreneur of the Year Award from 2012–2017.

Bob Hoover Freedom of Flight Award
Year	Winner
2006	Bob Hoover
2007	Forrest Bird & George McGovern
2008	Emily Howell Warner & Zoe Dell Nutter
2009	Kermit Weeks
2010	Doolittle Raiders & Sam Johnson
2011	Burt Rutan
2012	Neil Armstrong & Eugene Cernan
2013	Patrick Brady
2016	Clay Lacy
2018	Walter Eichhorn
2023	Lance Toland
2024	Dario Costa
2026	Marco Fürst & Marco Waltenspiel

- The award was called the Freedom of Flight Award prior to 2007.

Official Ambassador of Aviation Award
Year	Winner
2007	John Travolta

Aviation Industry Leader of the Year Award
Year	Winner
2007	Pete Bunce
2008	Ed Bolen
2009	Preston Henne
2010	Mark Van Tine
2014	Michimasa Fujino
2016	Phebe Novakovic
2018	Brian Barents
2021	Marc Parent
2021	Bin Chen
2023	Gilles Labbé

Legends Aviation Inventor Award
Year	Winner
2008	Si Robin

Harrison Ford Aviation Legacy Award
Year	Winner
2008	Harrison Ford
2009	Jeffrey Puckett
2010	Pat Epps
2011	Richard Sugden
2012	Greg Anderson
2013	Marilyn Richwine & Rhonda Fullerton
2014	Mark Baker
2015	Scott Terry
2016	Peter Paul Luce
2017	Jim Inhofe
2018	Sean Tucker

- The award was called the Legends Aviation Legacy Award prior to 2009.

Steven F. Udvar Hazy Award
Year	Winner
2017	Gen. Jack Dailey

Heritage Patriot Award
Year	Winner
2008	William Anders

Legends Top Flyer Award
Year	Winner
2008	Paul "Max" Moga

Aviation Mentor Award
Year	Winner
2009	Kurt Russell

Aviation Inspiration and Patriotism Award
Year	Winner
2009	Tom Cruise
2010	Sean Tucker
2011	Morgan Freeman
2012	David Ellison
2014	Angelina Jolie
2015	Miles O'Brien
2016	Mark & Scott Kelly
2018	Jim Payne
2022	William Shatner

Legends Wings of Hope Award
Year	Winner
2017	Frank Franke

Out–Of-This-World Landing & Takeoff Award
Year	Winner
2009	Buzz Aldrin

Cool Captain Award
Year	Winner
2010	James Lovell

Lifetime Aviation Engineering Award
Year	Winner
2010	Frank D. Robinson

Aircraft of Legend Award
Year	Winner
2011	Boeing 787 Dreamteam

Elling Halvorson Vertical Flight Hall of Fame Award
Year	Winner
2012	Roy Morgan
2013	Jack Erickson
2014	Elling Halvorson
2015	William "Bill" Chiles
2016	Steven Hickok
2017	Mike Silva
2019	Sergei Sikorsky
2021	Lon & Brenda Halvorson
2022	Max Lyons
2023	Lauren Sánchez
2024	Randy Waldman
2026	Didier Delsalle

- The award was called the Vertical Flight Hall of Fame Award prior to 2019.

Lifetime Aviation Industry Leader Award
Year	Winner
2012	James Albaugh
2013	Bruce N. Whitman
2015	Ray Conner
2017	David Joyce
2018	Jean Rosanvallon
2022	Mike Silvestro
2023	Mark Burns
2023	Guillaume Faury
2024	Ronald Draper
2025	Tony Lefebvre
2026	Jeremie Caillet

Jeff Bezos Freedom Wings Award
Year	Winner
2018	Jeff Bezos
2019	Capt. James Lovell

Doolittle Raiders Special Induction Award
Year	Winner
2015	Dick Cole & David Thatcher

Kiddie Hawk Children's Award
Year	Winner
2015	Col. Gail Halvorsen

Dream Chaser Award
Year	Winner
2018	Eren & Fatih Ozmen

World’s Safest, Longest Continuous Operating Airline Award
Year	Winner
2018	Leigh Clifford

Legends Wings of Help Award
Year	Winner
2018	Stefan Aust
2019	Claus & Gunnar Heinemann
2019	Thomas Schrade
2021	Bernd Breiter

Changing Lives With Aviation Award
Year	Winner
2018	Dick DeVos

Legends Technology Award
Year	Winner
2018	Bertrand Piccard

Technology Innovation Award
Year	Winner
2019	Robert Machtlinger & Hu Huazhi

Stratospheric Explorer Award
Year	Winner
2019	Alan Eustace

Aerospace Inspiration Award
Year	Winner
2021	Oliver Daemen

Barron Hilton Aviation Inspiration Award
Year	Winner
2021	Zara Rutherford
2022	Mack Rutherford
2024	Amanda Lee
2025	Xyla Foxlin

Dr. Sam B Williams Technology Award
Year	Winner
2023	Linden Blue
2023	Markus Bucher
2024	Burt Rutan
2025	Patrick Waddick

Dr. Buzz Aldrin Space Advancement Award
Year	Winner
2024	Jared Isaacman & Scott Poteet & Sarah Gillis & Anna Menon
2025	Elon Musk

== See also ==
- List of aviation awards
- Oswald Watt Gold Medal
- National Aviation Hall of Fame
