= Philip J. Klass =

UFO researcher (1919–2005)

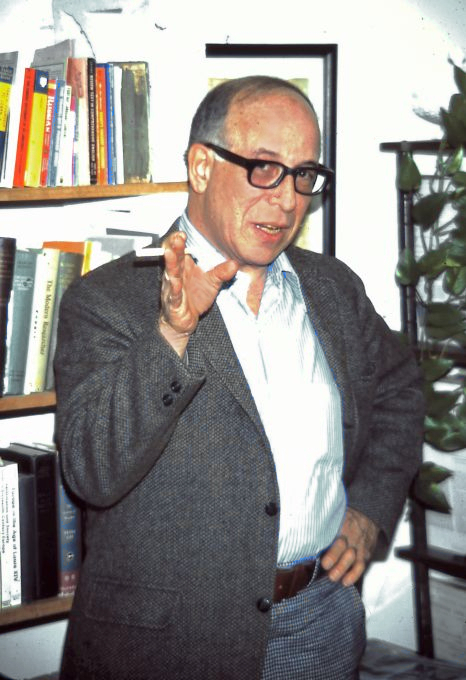
- Klass in 1977
- Born: Philip Julian Klass; November 8, 1919; Des Moines, Iowa
- Died: August 9, 2005 (aged 85); Cocoa, Florida
- Education: Iowa State College (B.S.E.E., 1941)
- Occupations: Aviation and Aerospace journalist Electrical Engineer; Ufologist
- Organization(s): Institute of Electrical and Electronics Engineers, American Association for the Advancement of Science, Aviation/Space Writers Association, National Press Club, National Aviation Club, CSICOP

Philip Julian Klass (November 8, 1919 – August 9, 2005) was an American aviation and aerospace journalist and UFO researcher, best known for his skepticism regarding UFOs. In the ufological and skeptical communities, Klass inspires polarized appraisals. He has been called the "Sherlock Holmes of UFOlogy". Klass demonstrated "the crusader's zeal for what seems 'right,' regardless of whether it brings popular acclaim," a trait he claimed his father instilled in him. "I've found," said Klass, "that roughly 97, 98 percent of the people who report seeing UFOs are fundamentally intelligent, honest people who have seen something—usually at night, in darkness—that is unfamiliar, that they cannot explain." The rest, he said, were frauds.

Longtime ufologist James W. Moseley illustrated the ambivalence many UFO researchers feel about Klass. On the one hand, Moseley argued that Klass was sincere in his motives and that his work ultimately benefited the field of Ufology. In his memoirs, Moseley contended that, when pressed, most leading ufologists would admit that Klass knew the subject and the people involved and was welcomed, or at least pleasantly tolerated, at UFO meetings. However, Moseley also wrote that he and Klass "have had and continue to have intense doctrinal and factual disagreements, and there are things about Phil's 'style', like his attack on James E. McDonald, that I do not admire or agree with." In his 1999 interview of Klass, fellow debunker Gary P. Posner wrote that despite some recent health problems, the 80-year-old "Klass's mind—and pen—remain razor sharp, to the delight of his grateful followers and to the constant vexation (or worse) of his legions of detractors."

== Personal life ==
Klass was born November 8, 1919, in Des Moines, Iowa, to Raymond Klass and Anne Traxler, and grew up in Cedar Rapids, Iowa. His father was a lawyer recognized throughout the United States as an expert on automobile negligence law. As a Boy Scout he won a ride in an autogyro (an early helicopter) at the Iowa State Fair, and his younger sister, Rosanne Klass, also recalled that he spent a lot of time building crystal radios. He graduated from Iowa State College in 1941 with a bachelor's degree in electrical engineering.

Klass moved from the Midwest to Washington, D.C., when he went to work for Aviation Week in 1952. Though a workaholic, he found time to enjoy sailing and snow skiing. And before his UFO activities became a full-time avocation in the 1960s, as a Civil War buff his electrical engineering training was put to use in designing and building animated electronic battle displays, some of which are on exhibit at the Gettysburg and Antietam battlefields.

A loner for much of his adult life, Klass married at age 60. His wife, Nadya, was six years his junior and worked for the Bulgaria service of Voice of America. They had no children of their own, but Nadya had a son who escaped with her from communist Bulgaria in 1973.

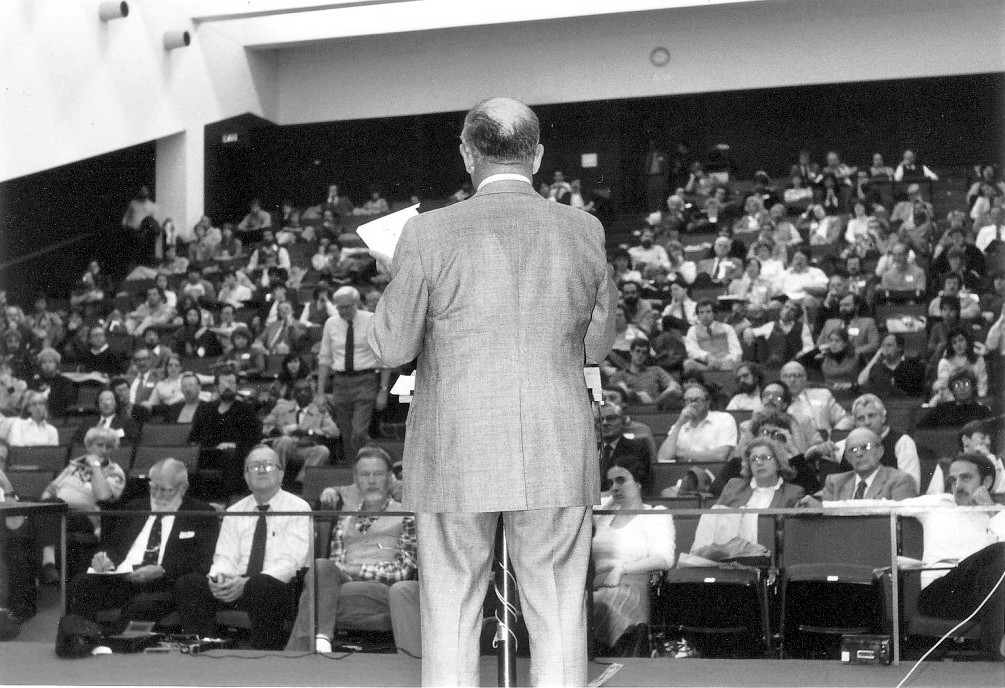
Klass at the 1983 CSICOP Conference in Buffalo, NY

== Career ==
=== Senior Avionics Editor, Aviation Week & Space Technology ===
For ten years, Klass worked for General Electric as an engineer in aviation electronics. Dissatisfied with his job, in 1952 he moved to Washington, DC, and joined Aviation Week, which later became Aviation Week & Space Technology. He was a senior editor of Aviation Week & Space Technology for thirty-four years.

Always striving to stay on the cutting edge, Klass published an "Exclusive Report on Counter Measures" in the November 18 and 25, 1957, editions of Aviation Week. This report was referred to the FBI for the "unauthorized disclosure of information classified 'Secret'". An investigation into the disclosure was dropped when the US Air Force told the FBI that the disclosed information could not be declassified for purposes of prosecution.

Klass wrote some of the first articles on inertial guidance systems (1956), infrared missile guidance (1957), and microelectronics (1957). His book Secret Sentries in Space (1971) was one of the first books about spy-satellite technology.

Declassified National Reconnaissance Office documents including a history of the Hexagon Project illustrate Klass's impact on the aerospace industry:

One of the magazines continually publishing articles on the progress of this nation's reconnaissance programs is AVIATION WEEK. Other publications have sporadically covered this area of government activity, but the most prolific writer on the subject has been AVIATION WEEK's Philip J. Klass. He did a thorough job in summarizing his knowledge of the United States reconnaissance program in a book titled ''Secret Sentries in Space''. Although lacking in some details and slightly inaccurate in others, little is left to the imagination of our nation's adversaries.

In 1973 Klass was named a fellow of the Institute of Electrical and Electronics Engineers. He also was a member of the American Association for the Advancement of Science, the now-defunct Aviation/Space Writers Association, the National Press Club, and the National Aviation Club. Asteroid 7277 (1983 RM2) was named "Klass" after him. He received the Lauren D. Lyman Award in 1989 from the Aviation/Space Writers Association for distinguished career-long achievements, and the Boeing Decade of Excellence Award for lifetime achievement in 1998 from the Royal Aeronautical Society.

Retiring in 1986 as senior avionics editor of Aviation Week & Space Technology, he continued to contribute to the magazine for several more years. Upon his death, Aviation Week's "Tribute" in its next issue lamented, "The international aviation and aerospace journalism community last week lost a role model—a professional the likes of which we probably will never see again. ... He was the best at what he did and displayed an overwhelming responsibility to his readers, whom he held in such high regard."

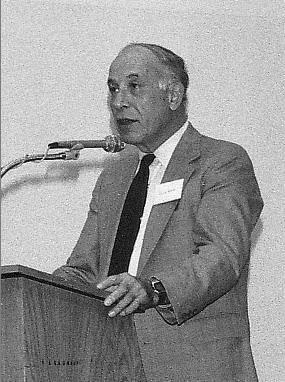
1983 CSICOP Conference in Buffalo, NY

=== UFO research ===
Klass's involvement in the UFO field can be traced to his reading of journalist John G. Fuller's Incident at Exeter (1966), about a series of UFO sightings in and around Exeter, New Hampshire. Noting that many of the Exeter UFO incidents took place close to high-power electric lines, Klass suspected that the UFO reports were best explained as a previously unknown type of plasma or ball lightning that might have been generated from the power lines or their transformers. A plasma, thought Klass, could be consistent with many UFO reports of bright lights moving erratically; a highly charged plasma might further explain the reported effects of UFOs on the electrical systems of airplanes and automobiles. Klass wrote up his theory in a review of Fuller's book which was published in Aviation Week. This was followed by another skeptical review of work by the National Investigations Committee on Aerial Phenomena (NICAP). These articles garnered Klass tremendous attention within the UFO community, and, as Howard Blum put it, "... as if overnight, he had been christened by both friends and foes 'the country's leading UFO debunker'".

Klass initially applied his ball lightning theory cautiously and selectively in a series of magazine articles. He and physicist James E. McDonald exchanged cordial letters on the subject, and McDonald agreed that some UFOs might be a type of ball lightning. However, in his first book on the subject, UFOs–Identified (1968), Klass argued that plasmas could explain most or all UFOs, even cases of alleged alien abduction.

Klass's plasma hypothesis was not well received by those on either side of the UFO debate, who noted that Klass was using one unverified phenomenon, his hypothetical plasmas, to explain another unverified phenomenon, UFOs. The two engaged in a bitter, months-long debate, leveling a variety of charges and accusations at one another. Eventually, Klass wrote to McDonald's superiors at the U.S. Navy (McDonald was formally retired from the Navy, but often worked with the Office of Naval Research), questioning how McDonald could spend so much time on UFO research and still fulfill the requirements for his atmospheric research grant. This did not result in McDonald losing ONR funding but did draw some criticism of Klass from members of the UFO community.

Criticism was also expressed by a more skeptical team of plasma experts assembled by the Condon Committee, all of whom rejected Klass's plasma theory as unscientific. Since that time, theories evoking similar phenomena with widely differing modes of generation have been proposed by commentators such as Michael Persinger, Terence Meaden, Albert Budden, and Paul Devereux. In 1999 the MoD Project Condign report proposed that "Unidentified Aerial Phenomena" (UAPs) comparable to the plasmas originally advocated by Klass (but as amended by Devereux and Randles) may represent a viable explanation for some UFO events. Therefore, while his original concept was discredited, it has been adapted by others, and in this regard Klass is regarded as a pioneer of this approach.

As he continued investigating more and more sightings, Klass realized that his plasma hypothesis could account for only a small subset of UFO reports. Thus, in his next book, UFOs Explained (1974), though continuing to invoke plasmas for some cases, Klass proposed a variety of explanations for the vast majority of UFOs, such as misidentification of prosaic objects (stars, meteors, rocket booster reentries, airplanes, balloons, etc.) as well as hoaxes. Jerome Clark contends that Klass argued in favor of hoaxes more than almost any other UFO skeptic, but that Klass rarely had evidence in favor of his accusations; this position was echoed by Don Ecker, who asserted that during a 1992 debate, Klass made unsubstantiated charges of "drug smuggling" against Australian pilot Frederick Valentich, who disappeared in 1978 after claiming a strange UFO was flying near his airplane.

Klass was a founding fellow of the Committee for the Scientific Investigation of Claims of the Paranormal (CSICOP, now the Committee for Skeptical Inquiry (CSI)) and served on its executive council and UFO subcommittee. He conducted a number of skeptic-centered reports on UFOs and UFO sightings. He published the bimonthly Skeptics UFO Newsletter from 1989 to 2003 and wrote several books on the subject (see below).

In the 1970s, Klass heaped praise on astronomer and UFO investigator Allan Hendry's The UFO Handbook, but Hendry objected strongly to Klass's modus operandi, which Hendry argued consisted of suppressing and distorting evidence, unscientific reasoning, ad hominem attacks, smear campaigns, scientific bait and switch tactics, and seemingly refusing to evaluate evidence that conflicted with his preconceptions. Nuclear physicist and UFO researcher Stanton T. Friedman also frequently jousted with Klass.

Klass's modus operandi when dealing with opponents such as Friedman was exceptional. He seemed to have an acute understanding of his position in both his career and his hobby and the power that position afforded him. When he learned of Friedman's plans to move to Canada in 1980, Klass wrote a letter to A.G. McNamara with the Herzberg Institute of Astrophysics at the National Research Council in Ottawa. For decades the NRC had been the unwilling recipient of UFO reports collected by the Royal Canadian Mounted Police. The NRC did not research the reports they received; they merely classified them as "meteorite" or "non-meteorite" and filed them. The purpose of Klass's letter was to bring "bad tidings"—that Stanton Friedman was moving to Canada. Klass warned that Friedman would begin accusing them of UFO coverups. He then went on to smear Friedman's professionalism, while simultaneously claiming to be Friedman's friend when discussing topics other than UFOs. Ten days later a memo was sent within the NRC management which said, "I don't know what we can do to prepare for the arrival in Canada of this man Friedman, but if he acts as Klass predicts we can ill afford the publicity he will generate for us." The decision was made quickly to turn over all UFO reports older than a year to the Public Archives of Canada. Klass's single letter apparently prompted a major records relocation in Canada and subsequently made Friedman's research easier than it otherwise might have been.

Klass was correct in that Friedman did indeed begin studying the Canadian UFO records and did accuse the Canadian government of covering up information. In an undated paper on the UFO situation in Canada, Friedman charged that "two government-sponsored investigative bodies" had covered up UFO information, and the government had "hidden or destroyed" further information. In the same paper Friedman also told a different version of the events leading to the Canadian UFO records being moved to the public archives. He claims that efforts by a "Canadian researcher" with the legal name of Mr. X and Friedman himself were responsible for having the records transferred.

Author Michael Sokolove wrote in his article "The Debunkers": "Klass was the voice of cool reason, seeking to demonstrate that a temporary inability to fill in the whole story should not open the door to wild speculation. His real argument, like all debunkers', was not with the people who believed that they had witnessed or experienced some paranormal event but with those who made an industry of igniting their imaginations."

Klass was willing to argue for his opinions wherever he perceived a challenge. In February 1975 he called the editor of the FBI Law Enforcement Bulletin and "in strong terms laced with sarcasm he derided our publication of the article by J. Allen Hynek, 'The UFO Mystery'". Klass accused the FBI of perpetuating a hoax in the form of extraterrestrial UFOs and referred to Hynek as a fraud. The editor explained to Klass that at no point did Hynek say that UFOs were extraterrestrial in origin, and that UFOs present a unique problem for law enforcement as they are often the first people called when a UFO is spotted. The editor also defended Hynek as a "widely respected scientist... affiliated with a leading university", to which Klass replied, "He won't be for long!" Klass followed up with a letter to the LEB offering a rebuttal article, but the offer was declined.

In 1987, Klass first saw the Majestic 12 documents. These were a set of documents "discovered" by ufologist Bill Moore and his associate, television producer Jaime Shandera. The documents appeared to prove a government cover-up of an alien crash at Roswell, New Mexico, in 1947. Klass immediately doubted the authenticity of the documents and set about trying to prove his suspicions. Klass was able to raise numerous questions about each document, but after several months he realized that only the government was in a position to debunk them. In late 1987 Klass wrote to the FBI to inform them that Moore was distributing what appeared to be top secret documents. This prompted a lengthy investigation, but definitive proof was never forthcoming from that investigation. In the end the consensus sided with Klass, with Friedman being the only central figure in the controversy to maintain the documents' authenticity. Klass did find then-classified documents that failed to mention anything about aliens.

In Gary P. Posner's 1999 interview, Klass explained his views on UFOs: "As I turn 80, my fondest hope is that a genuine ET craft will land on our back patio and that I will be abducted. Hopefully, with the ETs' advanced technology and knowledge, they will be able to cure my spinal and walking problems and the damage to my vocal cord. Of course, I would have to pay Stanton Friedman $10,000—based on my long-standing wager that UFOs will never be proven real—but I would expect to become wealthy from the royalties of a new book titled Why Me, ET? And instead of spending many hours each week 'debunking' UFOs, I'll finally have time to watch some TV, go to the movies, and perhaps get to read a few non-UFO books for enjoyment."

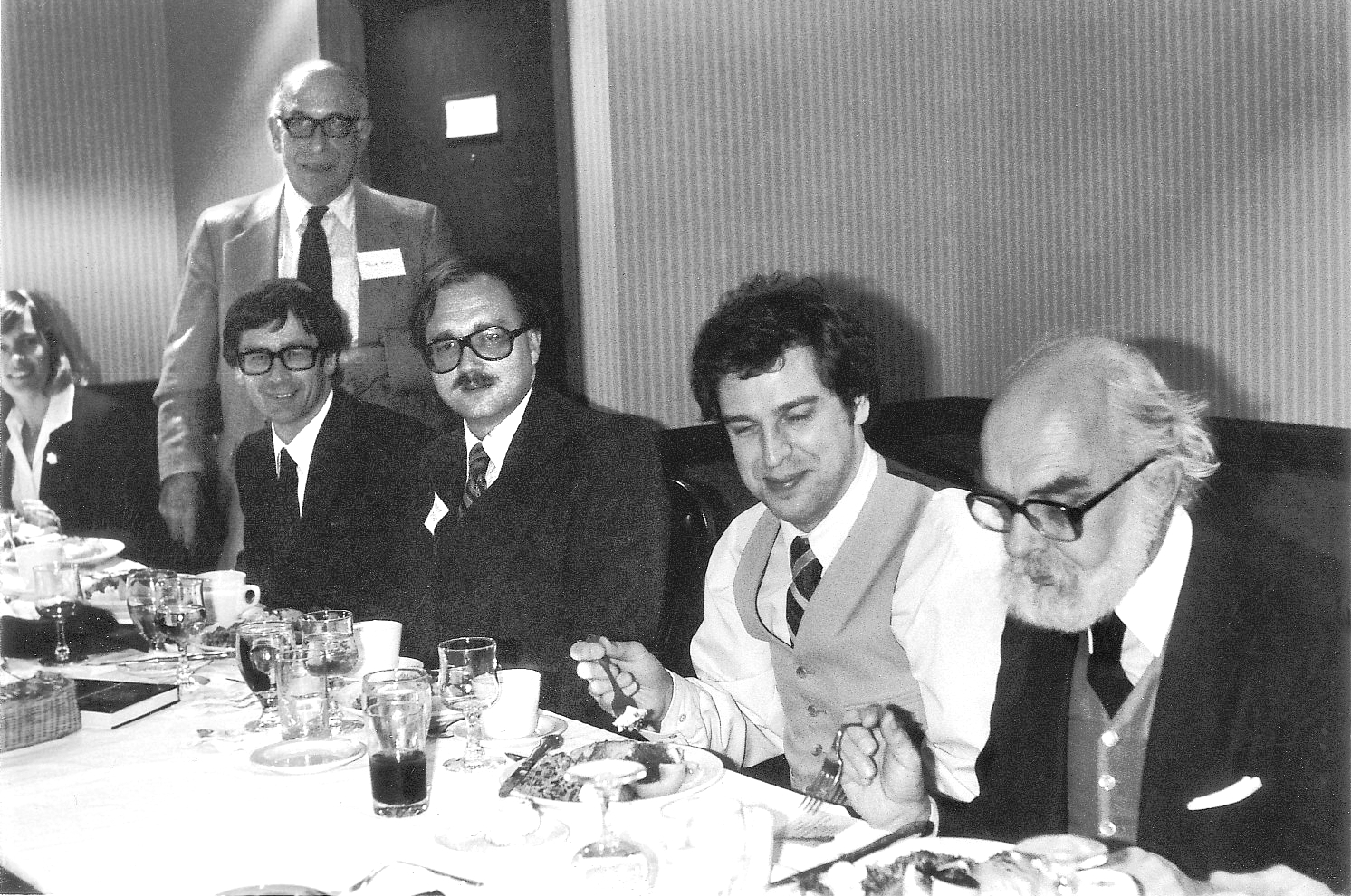
1983 CSICOP Conference in Buffalo, NY. Note: Randi's fork is bent. With Pip Smith, Klass (standing), Dick Smith, Robert Sheaffer, John Merrell, and James Randi

=== The $10,000 offer ===
In 1966, Klass made an offer that stood for the remaining thirty-nine years of his life. By 1974, the offer had changed slightly, to the following form:

- Klass agrees to pay to the second party the sum of $10,000 within thirty days after any of the following occur:

(A) Any crashed spacecraft, or major piece of a spacecraft is found to be clearly of extraterrestrial origin by the United States National Academy of Sciences, or
(B) The National Academy of Sciences announces that it has examined other evidence which conclusively proves that Earth has been visited by extraterrestrial spacecraft in the 20th century, or
(C) A bona fide extraterrestrial visitor, born on a celestial body other than the Earth, appears live before the General Assembly of the United Nations or on a national television program.

- The party accepting this offer pays Klass $100 per year, for a maximum of ten years, each year none of these things occur.

Klass made this offer openly to anyone. The offer was specifically declined by Frank Edwards, John G. Fuller, J. Allen Hynek, and James Harder, some of whom were the most vocal promoters of the extraterrestrial hypothesis. One person entered into the agreement with Klass. A man in Seattle, Washington, accepted the terms in 1969 and made two annual payments of $100. Then in 1971 he wrongly claimed the prize. When it was pointed out that his claim didn't meet any of the conditions, the man let the agreement lapse. In his book UFOs Explained, Klass offered to refund the full purchase price to every reader of the book if any of the conditions of his "UFO challenge" were ever met.

In another challenge, Klass claimed lexicographic inconsistencies based on the use of Pica typeface in the Cutler/Twining memo and offered $100 to Stanton Friedman for each legitimate example of the use of the same style and size Pica type as used in the memo. Friedman provided 14 examples and was paid $1,000 by Klass.

=== The UFO curse ===
Klass left this statement, originally published in Moseley's newsletter Saucer Smear on October 10, 1983.

THE LAST WILL AND TESTAMENT OF PHILIP J. KLASS

To ufologists who publicly criticize me, ... or who even think unkind thoughts about me in private, I do hereby leave and bequeath: THE UFO CURSE:

No matter how long you live, you will never know any more about UFOs than you know today. You will never know any more about what UFOs really are, or where they come from. You will never know any more about what the U.S. Government really knows about UFOs than you know today. As you lie on your own death-bed you will be as mystified about UFOs as you are today. And you will remember this curse.

== Awards ==
In addition to the previously mentioned lifetime achievement awards for his aerospace journalism, in 1994 the Committee for Skeptical Inquiry (CSI) presented Klass with its Distinguished Skeptic Award "in recognition of his unparalleled contributions to scientific and critical thinking in evaluating claims of extraterrestrial visitations." And in April 2011 CSI honored Klass again when, at a meeting of its executive council in Denver, Colorado, Klass was selected for inclusion in CSI's Pantheon of Skeptics, which was created by CSI to remember the legacy of deceased CSI Fellows and their contributions to the cause of scientific skepticism.

== Eponymous awards ==
=== The Philip J. Klass Award for Lifetime Achievement ===
Aviation Week & Space Technology holds an annual ceremony at which they present an award named for Klass. The Philip J. Klass Award for Lifetime Achievement cuts across all categories and criteria. The winner might be a scientist, pilot, engineer, technology specialist, business or industry leader—someone whose accomplishments will be the products of a long and varied career of service, creativity, and vision, and who has achieved widespread professional recognition and respect. The award was first presented in 1995, and recipients have included:

- 1995 Albert Lee Ueltschi, founder, FlightSafety International
- 1996 Richard H. Frost, test pilot
- 1997 Capt. E. B. Jeppesen, aviation pioneer
- 1998 Scott Crossfield, test pilot, and John Young, astronaut
- 1999 Paul MacCready, founder, AeroVironment
- 2000 Edmund F. Ball, CEO, Ball Corporation
- 2001 Jean-Luc Lagardère, CEO, Lagardère Group
- 2002 Leonard Greene, inventor of the Aircraft Stall Warning Device, and Noel W. Hinners, NASA
- 2003 Fitzhugh L. Fulton, U.S. Air Force/NASA and Civilian Test Pilot
- 2004 Keith Ferris, Aviation Artist, and A. P. J. Abdul Kalam, former President of India
- 2005 Assad Kotaite, President of the Council of the International Civil Aviation Organization, and William R. (Bob) Laidlaw, founder, Aerotest
- 2006 Patty Wagstaff, acrobatic flying champion
- 2007 Edward C. Stone, former director, JPL
- 2008 Mauricio Botelho, chairman, Embraer
- 2009 Hon. Alan Stephenson Boyd, United States Secretary of Transportation
- 2010 Richard W. Taylor, Boeing designer and test pilot
- 2011 Thomas J. Cassidy, Jr., General Atomics Aeronautical Systems, and Abraham Karem, founder, Karem Aircraft, Inc.
- 2012 Pete Rustan, former Director for Mission Support, National Reconnaissance Office
- 2013 C. Don Bateman, Chief Engineer, Corporate Fellow, Flight Safety Systems, Honeywell, and inventor of the Ground Proximity Warning System
- 2014 Harold Rosen, electrical engineer, known as the father the geostationary satellite
- 2015 John Leahy, COO – Customers, Airbus, and David Thompson, Chairman & CEO, Orbital Sciences Corporation
- 2016 Charles Elachi, former director of Jet Propulsion Laboratory and vice president of California Institute of Technology
- 2017 Charles Bolden, USMC aviator, and NASA astronaut, 12th NASA administrator, and John Tracy, retired chief technologist at Boeing
- 2018 Bruce N. Whitman, president of FlightSafety International, director Smithsonian National Air and Space Museum
- 2019 Paul Allen, financial backer of SpaceShipOne and founder of the Stratolaunch space transport system, and Tom Enders, CEO of Airbus
- 2020 Robert Leduc, Pratt & Whitney president (2016-2020)
- 2021 Marillyn Hewson, Former Chairman, President and Chief Executive Officer at Lockheed Martin
- 2022 Marc Parent (executive), president and CEO of CAE Inc.
- 2023-2024 Clay Lacy, founder and former CEO of Clay Lacy Aviation, and Daniel S. Goldin, propulsion engineer and former NASA administrator
- 2025 Norman R. Augustine, former CEO of Martin Marietta and Lockheed Martin, and Patrick Ky, former head of the European Union Aviation Safety Agency
- 2026 Bill Franke, former Chairman and CEO of America West Airlines and cofounder of Indigo Partners; Bob Twiggs and Jordi Puig-Suari, inventors of the CubeSat standard for small satellites

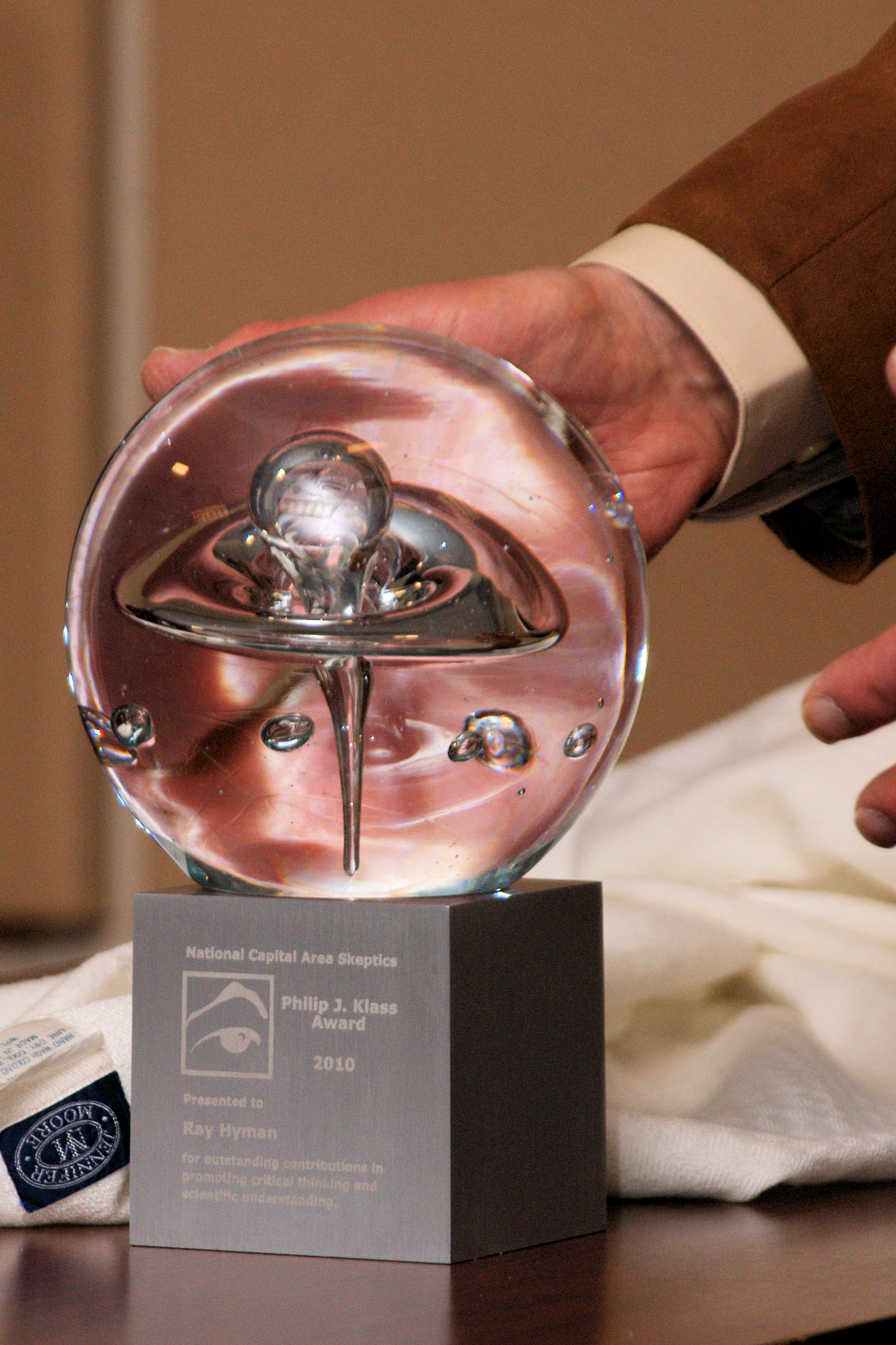
Ray Hyman accepts the 2010 NCAS Philip J. Klass Award.

=== The NCAS Philip J. Klass Award ===
Since 2006, the National Capital Area Skeptics in Silver Spring, Maryland, has presented its Philip J. Klass Award "for outstanding contributions in critical thinking and scientific understanding." Initially awarded annually but now more sporadically, the recipients have included:

- 2006 Michael Shermer, editor, Skeptic Magazine
- 2007 James Randi, founder, James Randi Educational Foundation
- 2008 Robert Park, emeritus professor of physics, University of Maryland
- 2009 Paul Kurtz, founder, Prometheus Books and Committee for Skeptical Inquiry
- 2010 Ray Hyman, founder, Skeptic's Toolbox
- 2011 Joel Achenbach, author and writer for The Washington Post
- 2012 Penn & Teller, entertainers and illusionists
- 2013 Phil Plait, astronomer, lecturer, and author
- 2014 Steven Salzberg, computer scientist, and bioinformatics expert
- 2016 John Mather, astrophysicist, cosmologist, and Nobel Laureate in physics
- 2022 Susan Gerbic, promoter of scientific skepticism through mentoring and other educational activities
- 2026 Glenn Kessler, editor and chief writer of The Washington Post Fact Checker column.

== Death ==
Klass died of cancer in Cocoa, Florida, on August 9, 2005, after moving to Merritt Island, Florida, in 2003.

== Works ==
Books

- UFOs – Identified, 1968, Random House, ISBN 0-394-45003-5
- Secret Sentries in Space, 1971, Random House, ISBN 0-394-46972-0, LCCN 77-143994 (about spy satellites)
- UFOs Explained, 1974, Random House, hardback ISBN 0-394-49215-3 Vintage Books paperback, ISBN 0-394-72106-3
- UFOs: The Public Deceived, 1983, Prometheus, ISBN 0-87975-322-6
- UFO Abductions: A Dangerous Game, 1989, Prometheus, ISBN 0-87975-509-1
- The Real Roswell Crashed-saucer Coverup, 1997, Prometheus, ISBN 1-57392-164-5
- Bringing UFOs Down to Earth, 1997, Prometheus, ISBN 1-57392-148-3 (for ages 9–12)

Articles

- "Plasma theory may explain many UFOs". Aviation Week & Space Technology. McGraw Hill. August 22, 1966. ISSN 0005-2175.
- "N-Rays and UFOs: Are they related". Skeptical Inquirer. 2 (1): 57–61. 1977. ISSN 0194-6730.
- "NASA, the White House, and UFOs". Skeptical Inquirer. 2 (2): 72–81. 1978. Reprinted in Paranormal Borderlands of Science.
- "UFOs, the CIA, and the New York Times". Skeptical Inquirer. 4 (3): 2–5. 1980. Reprinted in Paranormal Borderlands of Science.
- "UFO federation falls on hard times". Skeptical Inquirer. 9 (4): 314–316. 1985.
- "Crash of the Crashed-Saucer Claim". Skeptical Inquirer. 10 (3): 234–241. 1986. ISBN 9781615924011. Reprinted in The UFO Invasion and The Hundredth Monkey: And Other Paradigms of the Paranormal.
- "The Condon UFO Study: A Trick or a Conspiracy?". Skeptical Inquirer. 10 (4): 328–341. 1986. Reprinted in The UFO Invasion.
- "FAA Data Sheds New Light on JAL Pilot's UFO Report". Skeptical Inquirer. 11 (4): 322–326. 1987. Reprinted in The UFO Invasion.
- "The MJ-12 Crashed-Saucer Documents". Skeptical Inquirer. 12 (2): 137–146. 1987–1988. Reprinted in The UFO Invasion and The Hundredth Monkey: And Other Paradigms of the Paranormal.
- "MJ-12 Papers 'Authenticated'?". Skeptical Inquirer. 13 (3): 305–309. 1989. Reprinted in The UFO Invasion.
- "The 'Top-Secret UFO Papers' NSA Won't Release". Skeptical Inquirer. 14 (1): 65–68. 1989. Reprinted in The UFO Invasion.
- "New Evidence of MJ-12 Hoax". Skeptical Inquirer. 14 (2): 135–140. 1990. Reprinted in The UFO Invasion and The Hundredth Monkey: And Other Paradigms of the Paranormal.
- "Additional comments about the "Unusual Personal Experiences Survey"". Skeptical Inquirer. 17 (2): 145–146. 1993. Reprinted in The UFO Invasion.
- "Time Challenges John Mack's UFO Abduction Efforts". Skeptical Inquirer. 18 (4): 340–342. 1994. Reprinted in The UFO Invasion.
- "The GAO Roswell Report and Congressman Schiff". Skeptical Inquirer. 19 (6). 1995. Reprinted in The UFO Invasion.
- "That's Entertainment! TV's UFO Coverup". Skeptical Inquirer. 20 (6). 1996. Reprinted in The UFO Invasion.
- "A field guide to UFOs". Astronomy. 25 (9). Kalmbach Publishing: 30–35. September 1997. ISSN 0091-6358.
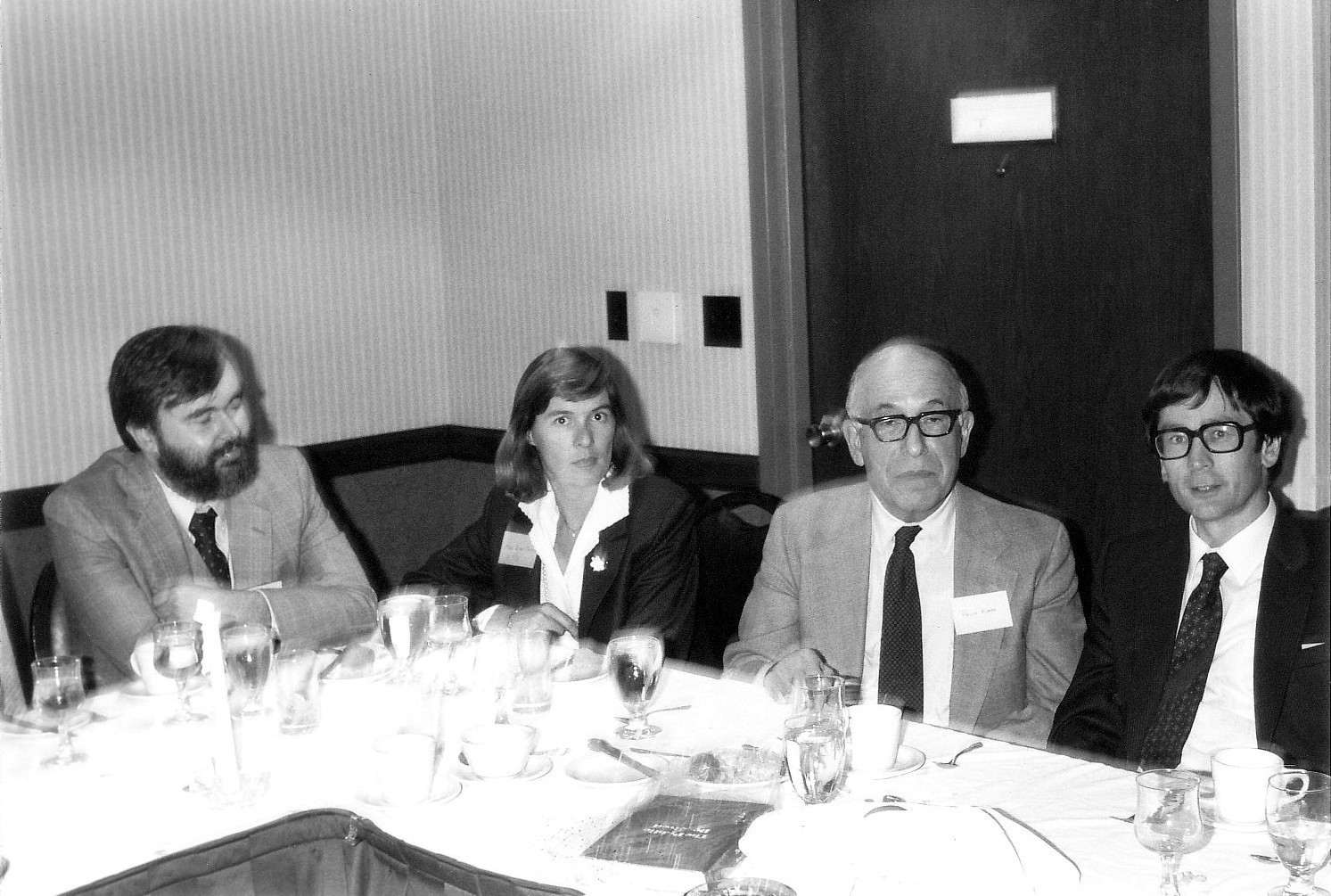
John Cole, Pip Smith, Klass, Dick Smith, 1983

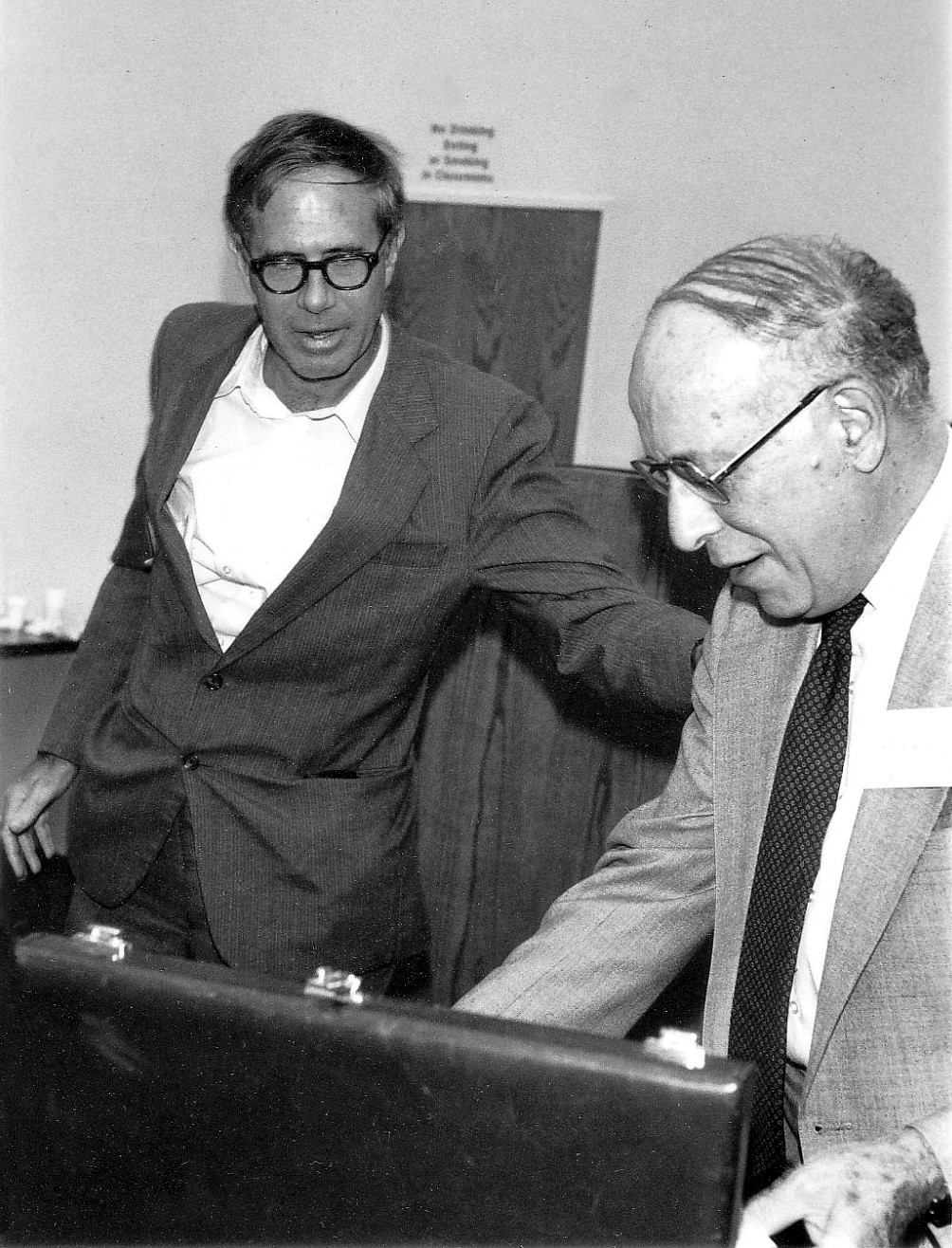
Moseley, Klass, 1983

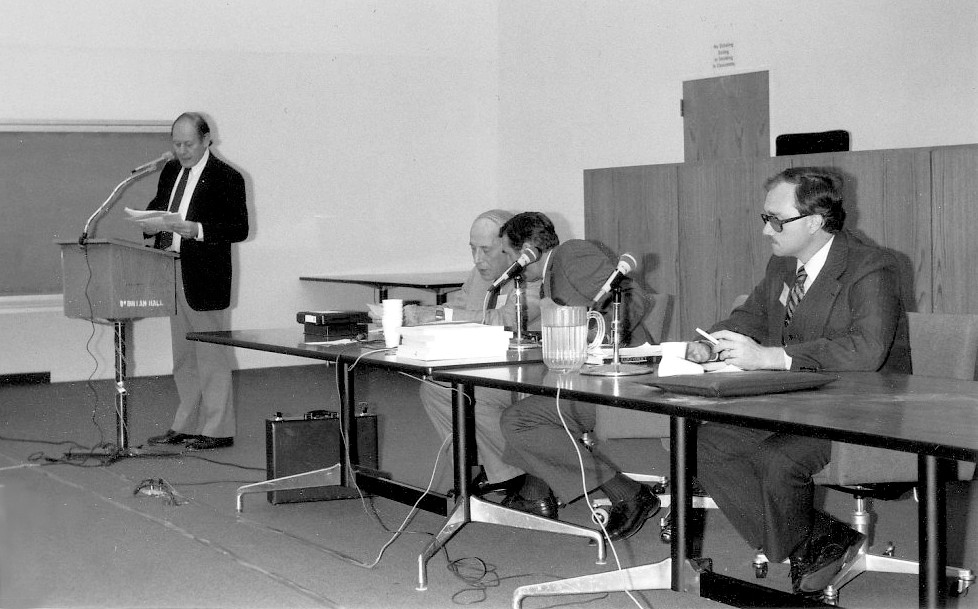
Kurtz, Klass, Rommel, Sheaffer, 1983

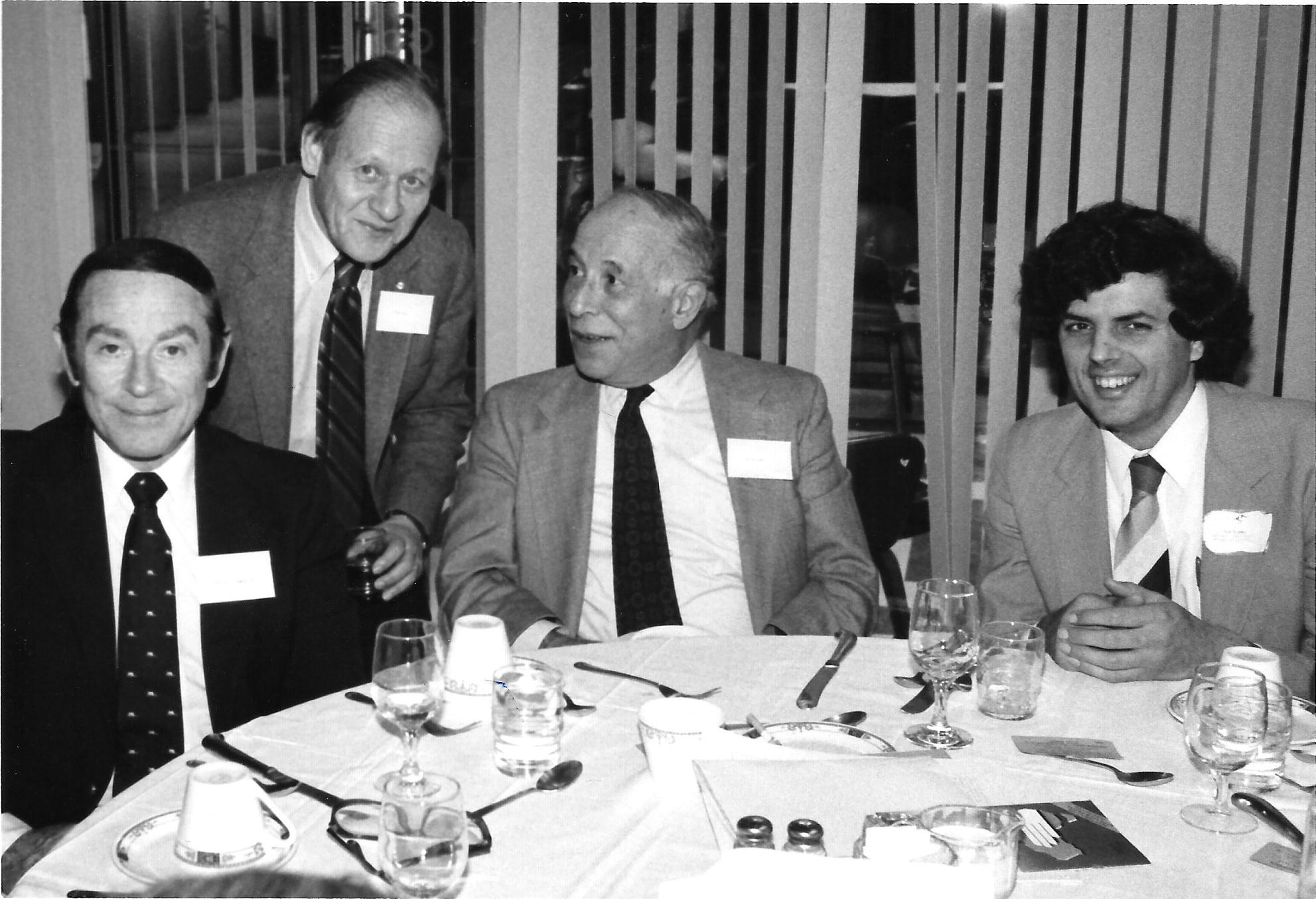
Stanford 1984 CSICOP Conference

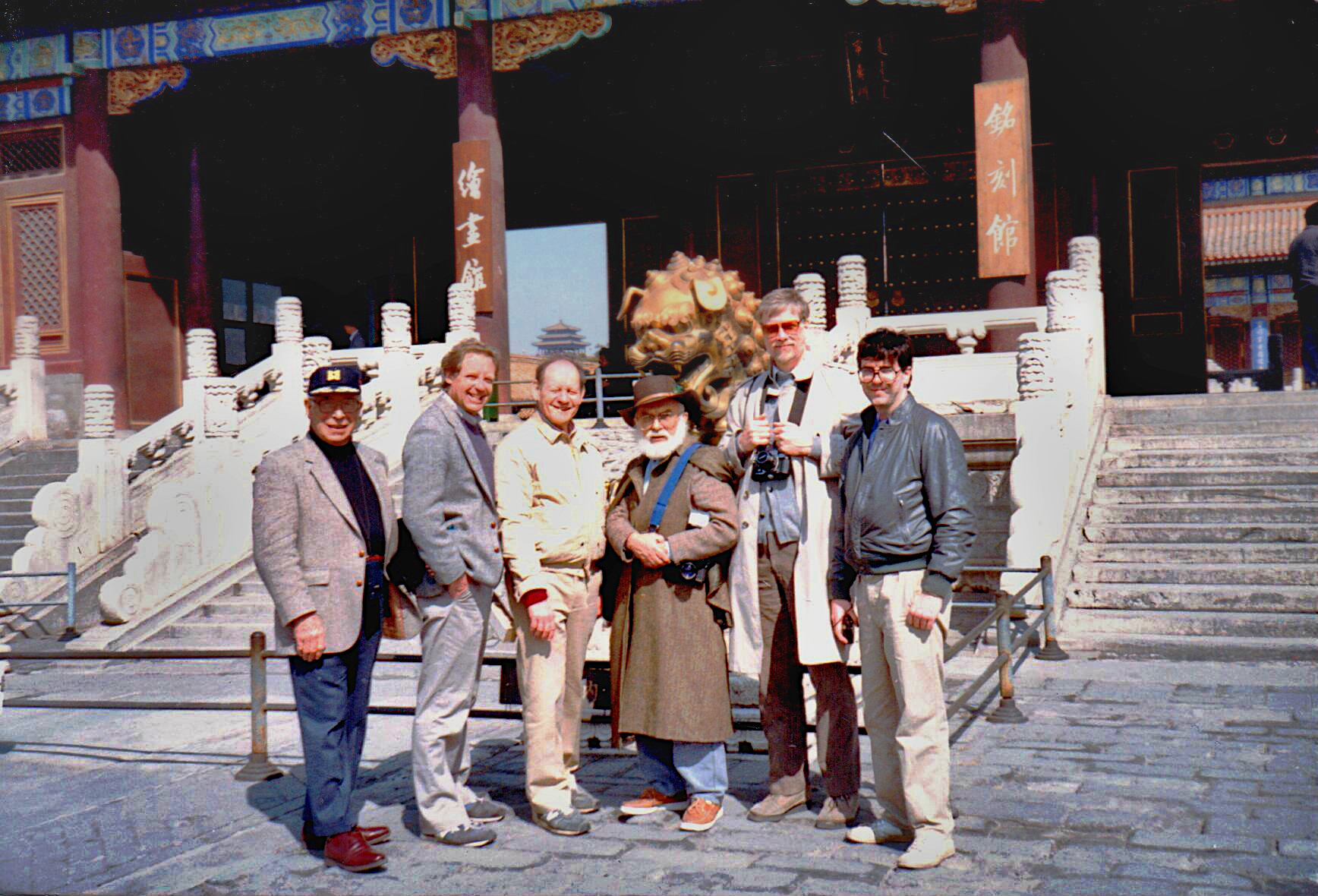
CSICOP in China 1988
