= James D. Raisbeck =

American aeronautical engineer (1936–2021)

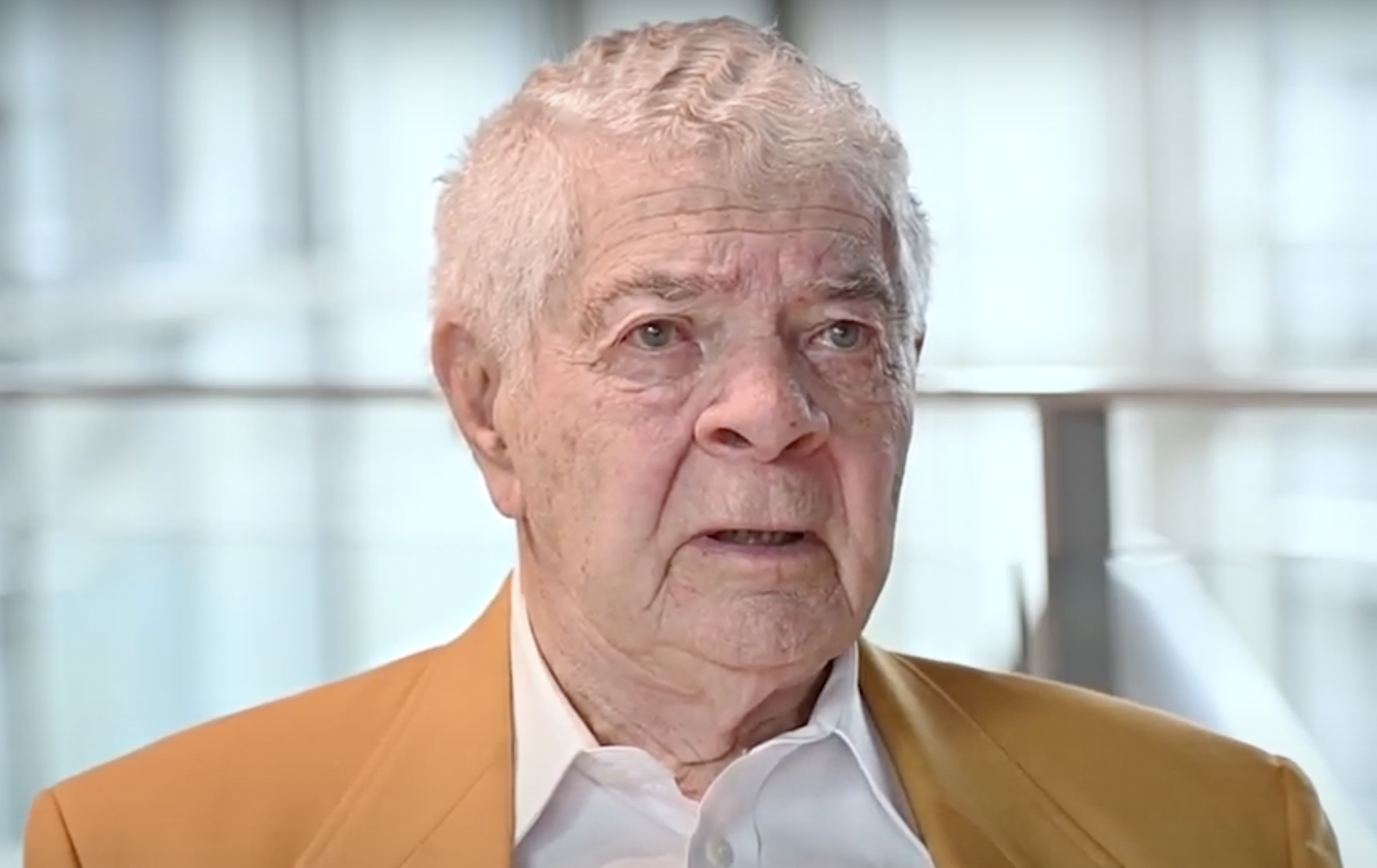
- Born: September 29, 1936; Whitefish Bay, Wisconsin, U.S.
- Died: August 31, 2021 (aged 84)
- Education: BSAeroEngr, BSSci, BSMath
- Alma mater: Purdue University
- Occupation: Aeronautical engineer
- Known for: Aircraft performance enhancement products
- Spouse: Sherry Raisbeck

James David Raisbeck (September 29, 1936 – August 31, 2021) was an American aeronautical engineer, known for his entrepreneurship in developing products which enhance the performance of production aircraft.

== Life and career ==
Raisbeck grew up in Whitefish Bay, a suburb of Milwaukee, Wisconsin. After high school, he entered Purdue University (1954), with the goal of studying mechanical engineering. However, he lasted only one semester before flunking out. Having to find a way to support a wife and daughter, he joined the United States Air Force. He served as a flight engineer on Convair B-36 bombers. After his four-year enlistment in the USAF, Raisbeck returned in 1958 to Purdue University. To help cover the costs of tuition and living expenses, he signed up for active reserve duty with the 434th Troop Carrier Wing at Bakalar AFB, Columbus, Indiana, as a flight engineer on Fairchild C-119s. He graduated in 1961 with a degree in aeronautical engineering, science and mathematics. Raisbeck moved to Seattle, Washington and joined Boeing as a research aerodynamicist in 1961. His first boss was Louis "Bernie" Gratzer, head of Boeing's aerodynamics research group. (Gratzer would, after retirement, join forces with Joe Clark at Aviation Partners Inc., developing their blended winglets.) While at Boeing, Raisbeck and a team of engineers and flight crew designed and flight-tested an internally blown trailing edge flap system on the prototype 707, 367-80, known as the Dash 80. The Dash 80 first flew in December 1963, and soon demonstrated flight at speeds as slow as 60 knots, at gross weights exceeding 150,000 lbs. Raisbeck's later assignments at Boeing included liaison with the aeronautical laboratories at Wright-Patterson Air Force Base and as a designer and program manager in preliminary design at Boeing.

Raisbeck had not used any of his allowed vacation time while working at Boeing. He eventually was forced by the payroll department to use his accumulated vacation time. While on vacation, he went to work for Robertson Aircraft, a Seattle-based small business that specialized in developing and certifying STOL kits for single- and twin-engine Cessna and Piper aircraft. In 1969 Raisbeck left Boeing to work full-time at Robertson Aircraft, where he soon became chairman, CEO, president and chief engineer.

At Robertson, Raisbeck participated in the development and construction of the University of Kansas Redhawk, a modified Cessna 177 Cardinal and the Advanced Technology Light Twin, a modified Piper PA-34 Seneca, both under contract to NASA. The Redhawk wing featured movable leading edge devices, Fowler flaps and spoilers for roll control. In 1970 he negotiated with Pierre Clostermann to have Reims Aviation install Robertson STOL kits onto production Reims F337 Skymasters.

In 1973 the expanded Robertson Aircraft Company was sold to an investment company, and Raisbeck left. He worked for one year for Allen E. Paulson at American Jet Industries in Los Angeles as vice president of technology. Deciding he wanted to start his own company, he founded Raisbeck Engineering in 1973, on his dining room table, with $500. His first project was the task of redesigning the wings of the Learjet for Gates Learjet. Clay Lacy had introduced Raisbeck to Dee Howard, founder of Howard Aero and The Dee Howard Company. Having problems with the wing redesign, Raisbeck became partners with Howard in February 1975, to enable him to complete the development of the Mark II system. The modification was intended to reduce the approach and takeoff speeds of the Learjet family. With Howard's help, he finished the program and Gates Learjet adopted the Mark II wing's principles in 1976. The system's enhancement of the low-speed Learjet flight characteristics and short runway performance led Gates Learjet to adopt the highly successful technology on new production aircraft, beginning in 1976.

In 1976 Rockwell contracted Raisbeck to redesign the wing of its Sabreliner series. All production Sabreliner 65 aircraft would be equipped with supercritical wings to be developed by Raisbeck, and Sabreliner models 60 and 80 would be retrofitted. The resulting Mark V wing was the first supercritical wing in service in the United States. Raisbeck built all 75 wing sets for the Sabre 65 in Seattle, and shipped them to Rockwell in El Segundo, California. His company now had 750 employees, most working on the supercritical wing program. Although the program was a technical success, by 1979, Raisbeck's company was in financial distress. Raisbeck declared bankruptcy in 1979.

On his own, in 1979 he developed the Mark IV Wing System for the Learjet 35/36 family of aircraft. This system reduced the aircraft's approach speeds, increased the level of operating safety.

Raisbeck regrouped and reformed his company in 1981, with five employees. His vice-president, Joe Clark, arranged a deal with Morrison-Knudsen and got Raisbeck started on developing the Mark VI system of performance enhancements for the Beech Super King Air. Clark would later go on to co-found Horizon Airlines and Aviation Partners Inc.

The Mark VI system included nacelle wing lockers, dual aft body strakes, exhaust stack fairings, engine inlet ram air recovery system, high-flotation landing gear doors and enhanced performance inboard wing leading edge. Raisbeck went on in 1983 to develop Quiet Turbofan Propellers for the King Air with Hartzell Propeller. The same propeller technology was later used by Raisbeck and Hartzell to develop a Quiet Turbofan Propeller for the de Havilland Canada DHC-6 Twin Otter. Installed on the King Air, the quiet propellers reduce the perceived noise levels enough to allow the airplanes to operate out of European airports with the most stringent noise requirements.

In 1994 Raisbeck introduced the aft fuselage locker for Learjet 35/36 aircraft, which allows the carriage of up to 11 cubic feet (0.31 m^{3}) and 300 pounds (140 kg) of cargo with easy external access to the watertight locker. The locker was also later certified for use on the Learjet 31.

Turning to airliners, in 1996 the Raisbeck Commercial Air Group completed recertification of the Boeing 727 to meet Stage 3 noise limits without weight and performance penalties. The Raisbeck Stage 3 Noise Reduction Systems for the Boeing 727 covered all models and weights. Aerodynamic innovation provided Stage 3 noise compliance without costly engine modifications, saving their operators several million dollars on each installation. American Airlines ordered and took delivery of 52 Raisbeck 727 Stage 3 systems. Other customers have included TWA, Pan Am, Air Algerie, TAME and many smaller airlines.

In August 2001 Raisbeck delivered a redesigned overhead bin system for JetBlue's fleet of Airbus A320s. Because of the design of enlarged bins, popular, 22-inch, upright bags carried by passengers could be stored crosswise, with the handle facing the door. The redesigned overhead door and extended bin floor almost double the usable overhead storage space, allowing for quick and easy baggage stowage. Raisbeck has now equipped all of JetBlue's Airbus fleet of more than 100 aircraft.

Raisbeck began developing bulletproof doors and bulkheads for Boeing 737s and 757s in 2000 (before the September 11-mandated FAA requirement). Four weeks after the September 11, 2001 attacks, the first of Raisbeck's prototype Hardened Cockpit Security System was installed. Alaska Airlines, American Trans Air and other airlines operating the Boeing 737 immediately ordered and took delivery of the cockpit doors. The doors included rapid decompression, emergency pilot egress and crash-crew cockpit ingress, bulletproof protection, cockpit-to-cabin visual identification and structural integrity. In March 2002 Raisbeck turned over its flight deck security business and customers to Boeing.

Returning to business aircraft in 2002–2005, Raisbeck developed the ZR LITE performance enhancement system for the Learjet 35/36 aircraft. The ZR LITE wing and flap system reduces cruise drag by almost 10 percent and increases the FAA-certified takeoff performance, allowing these airplanes to operate safely into and out of many previously unavailable airports. The Learjet 35/36 were first to be certified, in 2005, followed by the Learjet 31/31A in 2006. Bombardier Aviation Services and other independent Learjet maintenance facilities make these kit installations in the U.S. and internationally.

Work is currently underway at Raisbeck Engineering on developing an aft fuselage locker system for the Learjet 60 aircraft.

Raisbeck was a major donor to Highline School District's Aviation High School. Since moving to its new facility adjacent to Seattle's Museum of Flight it is now known as Raisbeck Aviation High School.

Raisbeck died on August 31, 2021, at the age of 84.

== Awards and honors ==
Raisbeck was a member of the board of the Museum of Flight, the Seattle Opera, Pacific Northwest Ballet, Seattle Symphony Orchestra and The Seattle Arts Fund. Seattle's Hope Heart Institute honored Raisbeck and his wife, Sherry, an artist and former special education teacher, with its "Wings of Hope" 2003 annual award for their leadership in philanthropy. The Raisbecks were selected as the 2007 Seattle-King County First Citizens for their generous support of local arts, education and medical research organizations.

Purdue University honored Raisbeck with its Distinguished Engineering Alumnus Award in 1979, and presented him with its Outstanding Aerospace Engineer Award in 1999. In May 2005 he received Purdue University's highest recognition to engineers, an honorary doctorate in engineering.

In 2000, Professional Pilot Magazine named Raisbeck Aviation Entrepreneur of the Year. In 2002 the National Business Aviation Association awarded him its NBAA Meritorious Service to Aviation Award. Raisbeck was the recipient of the prestigious Pathfinder Award, bestowed by Seattle's Museum of Flight in October 2007. In January 2008 he received the Lifetime Aviation Entrepreneur Living Legends of Aviation award in honor of his contributions in the field of aviation and aeronautics spanning a 50-year period.

In 2011, Raisbeck was inducted into the International Air & Space Hall of Fame at the San Diego Air & Space Museum.
