= Marc Parent =

Marc Parent may refer to:

- Marc Parent (executive) (born 1961), French-Canadian business executive
- Marc Parent (police), former Chief of the Montreal Police Service

== See also ==
- Mark Parent (born 1954), Canadian clergyman and former politician
