= Clay Lacy =

American aviator

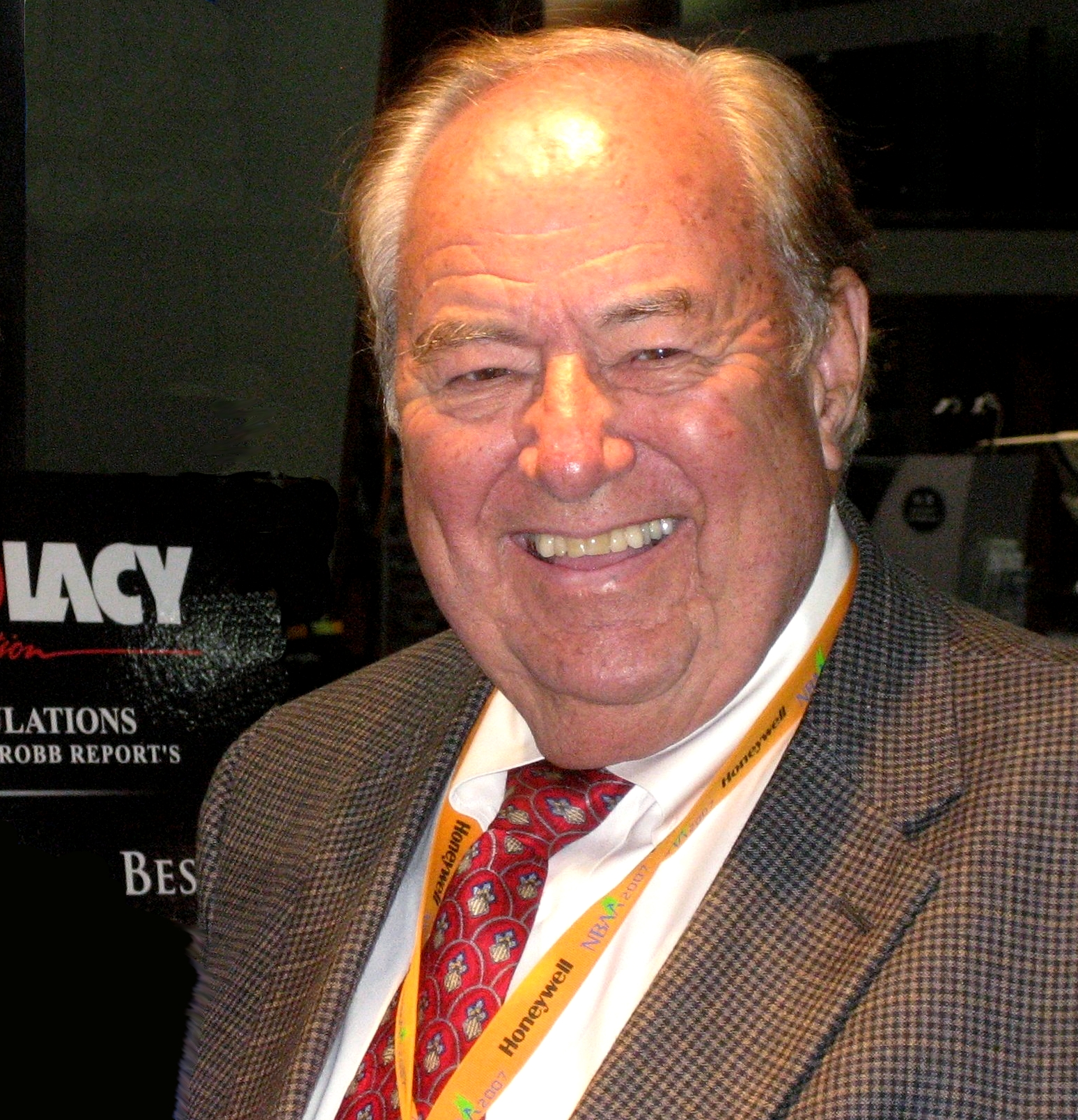
- Lacy in 2007
- Born: August 14, 1932 (age 93); Wichita, Kansas, U.S.
- Known for: Clay Lacy Aviation; aerial cinematographer; accumulating the most turbine jet flight hours in history at c. 50,000
- Aviation career
- First flight: Beechcraft Staggerwing
- Famous flights: Friendship One; Classroom in the Sky; Midway 2000
- Website: claylacy.com
- Military career
- Allegiance: United States of America
- Branch: California Air National Guard
- Service years: 1954–1964

Hershel Clay Lacy (born August 14, 1932) is the founder and former CEO of Clay Lacy Aviation, established in 1968 as the first executive jet charter company in the Western United States.

His professional resume includes airline captain, military aviator, experimental test pilot, air race champion, world record-setter, aerial cinematographer, and business aviation entrepreneur. Lacy has flown more than 300 aircraft types, logged over 50,000 flight hours and accumulated more hours flying turbine aircraft than any other pilot in history.

== Aviation career ==
Growing up on a farm near Wichita, Kansas, during the Great Depression, Lacy developed an early fascination with flight. He learned how to build model airplanes at age five and created his first gasoline-powered flying model at age eight. At age 12, Lacy piloted his first aircraft at Cannonball Airport, built on his grandmother's farm about three miles outside the city limits of Wichita, where he worked in exchange for flying time. In 1948, at age 16, he earned a flight instructor rating.

By age 19, Lacy had accumulated nearly 2,000 hours of flight time as both an instructor and ferry pilot. In January 1952, Lacy joined United Airlines as copilot on the Douglas DC-3 aircraft and was stationed at Los Angeles International Airport, where he was based for his entire airline career. During his time with United Airlines, Lacy flew the Convair 340, Douglas DC-3, Douglas DC-4, Douglas DC-6, Douglas DC-7, Douglas DC-8, Douglas DC-10, Boeing 727 and Boeing 747-400. He retired seniority No. 1 in 1992 after 41½ years of incident-free flying.

In 1954, Lacy took military leave from United Airlines to join the California Air National Guard at Van Nuys Airport, where he flew the F-86 Sabre jet and became the officer in charge of instrument training. He was called to active duty in 1961 for one year during the Berlin crisis, flying the C-97 Stratofreighter on missions to Japan and Vietnam. He retired from military service three years later.

In 1964, Lacy flew the first Learjet into Van Nuys Airport in proximity to Hollywood’s burgeoning entertainment industry, shaping a new era in corporate air transportation and mobility. In 1968, he founded Clay Lacy Aviation as the first jet charter company on the West Coast, known as one of the most experienced operators of private jets in the world.

Between 1964 and 1972, Lacy found time between flying for United Airlines and running his private charter business to fly his P-51 Mustang in air races across the United States. In 1970, he placed first in the Reno National Air Races Unlimited class competition.

In the early 1970s, in partnership with Continental Camera Systems, Inc., Lacy helped revolutionize air-to-air cinematography with the Astrovision camera system. He is credited with more than 3,000 film projects for the military, motion pictures and television, including most airline commercials featuring air-to-air photography.

During the 29-day United Airlines pilot strike of May 1985, Lacy was one of the first and most prominent pilots to cross the picket line and go back to work, thus undermining the unionized pilots' attempts at better pay and work rules. The decision garnered him significant criticism from many in the industry, and caused him to be listed on the airline unionist's "US Master Pilot Scablist".

Lacy holds 29 world speed records, including a 36-hour, 54-minute, and 15-second around the world record in 1988 flying a Boeing 747SP called "Friendship One" that raised $530,000 for children's charities.

On July 17, 2010, Lacy was inducted into the National Aviation Hall of Fame for his achievements as an aviation pioneer. The same year, he was awarded the Pathfinder Award by the Seattle Museum of Flight and the Federal Aviation Administration's Wright Brothers Master Pilot Award. In November 2011, Lacy was inducted into the Kansas Aviation Hall of Fame, housed at the Kansas Aviation Museum in Wichita, Kansas. In June 2020, the Los Angeles Business Journal listed Clay Lacy among the 500 most influential people in L.A. for the fifth consecutive year.

== The Lear connection ==
During development of the Learjet in the early 1960s, Lacy formed a close personal relationship with the aircraft’s inventor William Powell Lear. At Lear’s invitation, Lacy made several trips to his hometown of Wichita to tour the factory and share his knowledge and ideas.

After participating in a Learjet demonstration flight in 1964 with friend and business partner Allen Paulson, Lacy was appointed manager of sales for 11 Western states at the Learjet distributorship California Airmotive Corporation. The same year, Lacy resigned from the California Air National Guard to focus on the new business venture and become one of the first pilots to earn a Learjet type rating.

In October 1964, Lacy flew a Lear Model 23 from Wichita to Los Angeles to become the first corporate jet based at Van Nuys Airport. The Learjet’s popularity in the entertainment industry began with American singer, actor and Rat Pack leader Frank Sinatra who was an early aircraft buyer.

In 1965, Lacy and longtime friend and former California Air National Guard pilot Jack Conroy flew the Learjet on a record-setting transcontinental round-trip flight from Los Angeles to New York and back. The flight marked the first time a business jet made a round-trip flight across the United States between sunrise and sunset on the same day.

The same year, actor, comedian and pilot Danny Kaye was appointed vice president of public relations for the distributorship, renamed Pacific Lear Jet. Lacy and Kaye flew several hundred hours in the Learjet together, making four charity flights to benefit the United Nations Children’s Fund.

In 1968, Lacy founded his own on-demand charter company, where he developed a clientele of Hollywood celebrities and prominent business people, a legacy that continues today.

== Air races ==
Between 1964 and 1972, Lacy found time between flying for United Airlines and running his private charter business to fly his P-51 Mustang in every Unlimited class air race in the United States. He served as president of the national Professional Race Pilots Association from 1966 to 1970.

Flying with the character “Snoopy” painted on the tail of his signature purple race plane, Lacy consistently placed second and third in the competitions, but aspired to win first place in a major pylon race. In 1970, Lacy claimed victory as national air race champion in the Unlimited class.

The following year, he also placed first in a cross country race from Milwaukee to St. Louis and in the St. Louis Fighter Pilot Air Tournament. He also won first place in The Great Race from London, England, to Victoria, British Columbia, flying a Learjet.

In 1970, Clay created worldwide attention when he and Allen Paulson flew a four-engine Douglas DC-7 nicknamed Super Snoopy in the California 1000 Mile Air Race at Mojave, California. They finished in sixth place out of twenty at an average speed of 325 miles per hour, marking the first and only time a four-engine airliner ever competed in a pylon event.

== Aerial cinematography ==
In partnership with Continental Camera Systems, in the early 1970s, Lacy revolutionized air-to-air cinematography with Astrovision, a unique relay lens system with periscopes mounted on the top and bottom of the airplane’s fuselage. With full video monitoring to film above or below a Learjet, the system is able to rotate 360 degrees in any direction and tilt up and down with no speed or altitude restrictions. At its introduction, never before had any camera system provided such continuous and unrestricted use.

Filming flying scenes and stunt work for major motion pictures has been part of Lacy’s lifelong work. Overall, he has filmed more than 3,000 projects for the military, feature films and television, including almost every airline commercial featuring air-to-air photography. It was Lacy who recorded most of the action-packed aerial sequences in Paramount Pictures' Top Gun (1986). He is also known for his work on the movies Firefox (1982), Armageddon (1998), Cliffhanger (1993) and Behind Enemy Lines (2001).

Lacy is a member of both the Screen Actors Guild and Directors Guild of America, and was named “Outstanding Director of Mobile Camera Platform” by the Society of Camera Operators in 2004.

== Famous flights ==
With 29 world speed records under his belt, Lacy’s name has appeared in many newspaper headlines and aviation record books.

On September 19, 1962, in California’s Mojave Desert, Lacy and fellow Air National Guard pilot Jack Conroy attracted national attention when they made the first flight of the Pregnant Guppy, a Boeing 377 Stratocruiser modified to carry the Saturn rocket booster in support of the U.S. space program. The aircraft carried its first payload for NASA to Cape Canaveral one year later.

On June 8, 1966, Lacy piloted a Learjet 23 owned by Frank Sinatra. Earlier that day, he flew Sinatra and Dean Martin from Burbank to Palm Springs before flying out near Edwards Air Force Base to film a formation flight of five aircraft, including one of the two XB-70 Valkyries. The flight, intended as a promotional shoot for General Electric, ended in disaster when an F-104 collided with the XB-70, resulting in the loss of both aircraft and deaths of F-104 pilot Joe Walker and XB-70 co-pilot Major Carl Cross.

In 1973, Lacy and fellow United Airlines pilot William Arnott made aviation and education history by organizing an around-the-world flight in a chartered United Airlines DC-8 jetliner for aeronautical students from Mount San Antonio College located in Walnut, California. Two years later, in 1975, Lacy and the same crew flew students on an eight-day South American sojourn. These tour flights, named “Classroom in the Sky”, pioneered the concept of education from a jet plane.

One of Lacy’s most notable achievements was setting a new around-the-world speed record in 1988 with his 36-hour, 54-minute, 15-second flight in a Boeing 747SP called "Friendship One". With U.S. astronaut and Apollo 11 commander Neil Armstrong on board as guest of honor, along with other aviation notables and celebrities, this record-breaking flight raised $530,000 for children’s charities worldwide. Lacy and his wife Lois, along with long-time friends Bruce McCaw and Joe Clark, organized the flight, which averaged over 623 miles per hour and topped the previous record by 112 miles per hour.

In 1995, Lacy was one of the first aircraft owners to equip his Gulfstream jets with Blended Winglet™ technology developed by Aviation Partners Inc., founded by Joe Clark and Dennis Washington. That June, in a Gulfstream IISP inscribed with the words “Wings of Change” across its side, Lacy and Clark set world speed records during a flight from Los Angeles to Paris. The flight culminated with display of the jet at the Paris Air Show. On the way home, they also established a world speed record from Moscow to Los Angeles. Lacy and Clark set yet another speed record in the Gulfstream IISP in 2003 on a flight from Los Angeles to Kitty Hawk, North Carolina.

During Lacy’s 1999 "Midway 2000" flight to celebrate the New Year, he and 40 guests traveled over the Pacific Ocean to be among the first to enter the new millennium. Lacy piloted his Boeing 727 from Southern California by way of Hawaii and Midway Island to the International Dateline. Cruising just one-tenth of a mile west of the imaginary line where every day officially begins, the passengers then passed into January 1, 2000, while it was still 4 a.m. on December 31, 1999, on the West Coast. In a period of one hour, the group traveled through five date changes before celebrating the New Year on the ground in Midway Island 24 hours later.

== Honors ==
- Aero Club of Northern California Crystal Eagle Award
- Aero Club of Southern California Howard Hughes Memorial Award
- Air Transportation Association William A. Ong Memorial Award
- AOPA's Robert A. “Bob” Hoover Trophy
- Aviation and Business Journal Lifetime Achievement Award
- Aviation Week Network Laureate Awards Lifetime Achievement Award (2024)
- City of Hope Spirit of Life Award
- Duncan Aviation Excellence Award
- Federal Aviation Administration Wright Brothers Master Pilot Award
- Flight Path Museum & Learning Center Honoree
- Flight Test Historical Foundation Achievement in Aviation Award
- International Aerospace Hall of Fame Inductee (2009)
- Kansas Aviation Hall of Fame Inductee (2011)
- Living Legends of Aviation Lifetime Aviation Entrepreneur Award
- National Aviation Hall of Fame Inductee (2010)
- NBAA Meritorious Service to Aviation Award
- Professional Pilot Magazine Writer of the Year
- Seattle Museum of Flight Pathfinder Award
- Society of Camera Operators Cammy Lifetime Achievement Award
- Society of Experimental Test Pilots Member
- United Airlines Historical Foundation William S. Arnott Legacy Award
- Wichita Aero Club Trophy (2020)

== Film credits ==
Lacy is best known as an aerial cinematographer for the films The Great Santini (1979), The Right Stuff (1983), Octopussy (1983), Top Gun (1986), Cliffhanger (1993), Armageddon (1998), and Behind Enemy Lines (2001). Among his other notable works are:

- Ice Station Zebra (1968)
- The Day of the Jackal (1973)
- Airport 1975 (1974)
- Superman (1978)
- Operation Bluebook (1978)
- Capricorn One (1978)
- The Pilot (1979)
- The Concorde... Airport '79 (1979)
- The Great Santini (1979)
- Space (1980)
- The Island (1980)
- The Last Chase (1981)
- Firefox (1982)
- The Right Stuff (1983)
- Deal of the Century (1983)
- Octopussy (1983)
- Call to Glory (1984)
- The Never Ending Story (1984)
- White Nights (1985)
- Top Gun (1986)
- Dragnet (1987)
- Look Who's Talking (1989)
- Revenge (1990)
- Flight of the Intruder (1991)
- McBain (1991)
- Sinatra (1992)
- Cliffhanger (1993)
- Lois & Clark: The New Adventures of Superman (1993)
- The Client (1994)
- Clear and Present Danger (1994)
- Sgt. Bilko (1996)
- Con Air (1997)
- Contact (1997)
- True Vengeance (1997)
- Turbulence (1997)
- Wag the Dog (1997)
- Air Force One (1997)
- Iron Eagle II (1998)
- Armageddon (1998)
- Behind Enemy Lines (2001)
- Rat Race (2001)
- I Spy (2002)
- S.W.A.T. (2003)
- Hero (2004)
- Miracles (2004)
- Stealth (2005)
- One Six Right (2005)
- Amazing Grace (2006)
- Transformers (2007)
