= Friendship One =

World speed record flight of a United Boeing 747SP

Friendship One was a successful attempt at beating the round-the-world air speed record.

The flight was conducted from January 29 to January 30, 1988, and was operated by a Boeing 747SP N147UA, owned by United Airlines. A charitable foundation, the Friendship Foundation, was established and all money went to children's charities. A ticket on the flight cost US$5,000, and, in total, the flight raised about US$500,000. A total of 141 passengers were on board, including Neil Armstrong and Bill Lear's widow, Moya.

The previous speed record of 45 hours, 26 minutes, and 55 seconds was set by a Gulfstream III business jet. Friendship One, captained by Clay Lacy, followed a 23,125-mile route from Seattle, Washington to refueling stops in Athens and Taipei, and back to Seattle. It completed the trip in 36 hours, 54 minutes, and 15 seconds. Later in 1988, a Gulfstream IV made a similar eastbound circumnavigation in 36 hours, 8 minutes, which stands as the world record as of 2013.
