= International Air & Space Hall of Fame =

Hall of fame at the San Diego Air & Space Museum

Coordinates: 32.7262°N 117.1544°W

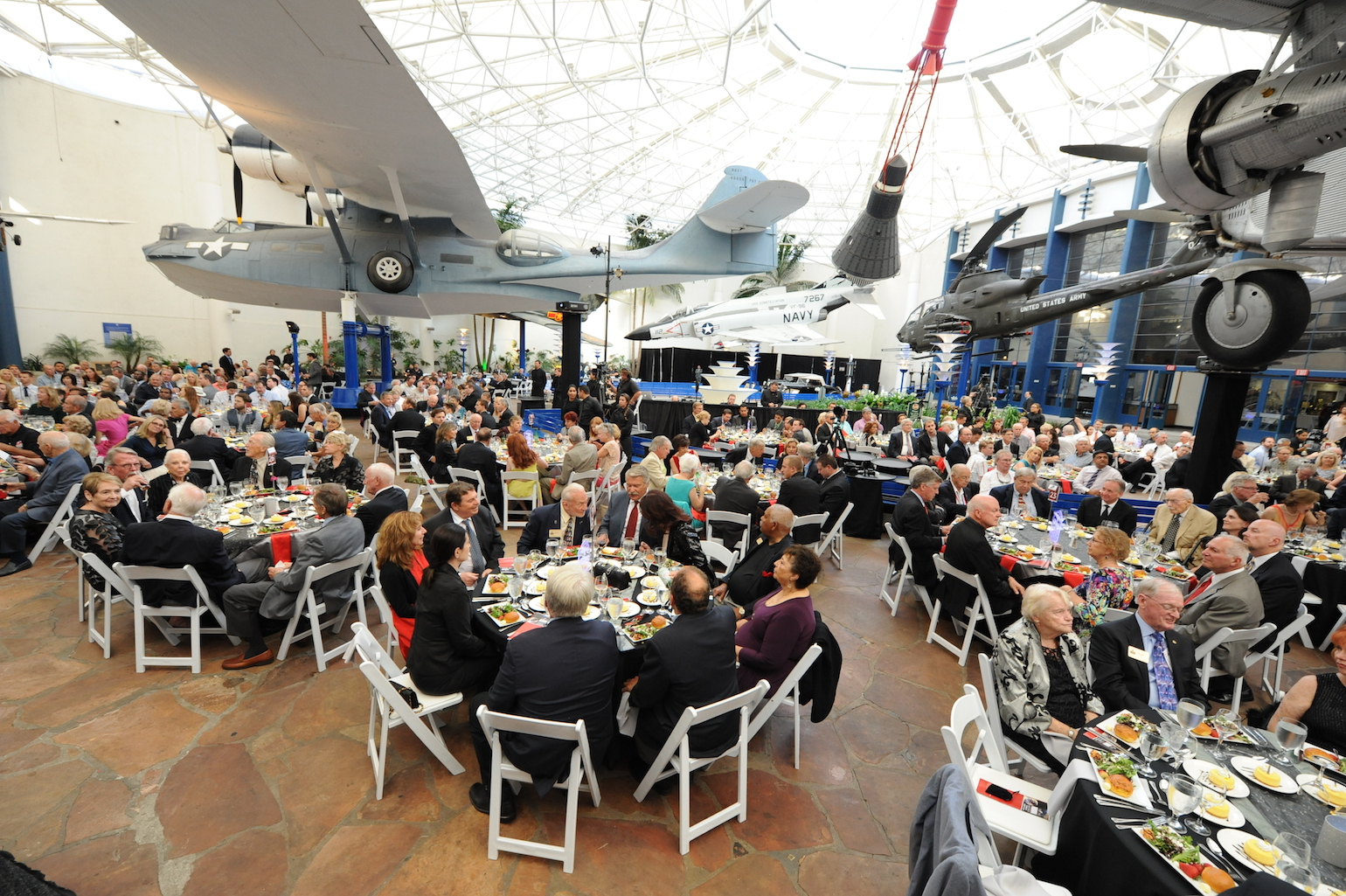
The 2016 induction gala for the International Air & Space Hall of Fame.

The International Air & Space Hall of Fame is an honor roll of people, groups, organizations, or things that have contributed significantly to the advancement of aerospace flight and technology, sponsored by the San Diego Air & Space Museum. Since its founding in 1963, over 200 individuals have been inducted into the hall, with new additions inaugurated at an annual gala.

== History ==
The International Aerospace Hall of Fame (IAHF) was incorporated on 27 September 1963 as a nonprofit with the mission "to honor the great achievers of aviation and space endeavors" and the first induction ceremony took place on 18 March 1965 at the San Diego Convention Hall. Although originally housed in the San Diego Air & Space Museum, the Hall of Fame was a separate entity with its own board of directors, until the two institutions merged in 1993. On 22 February 1978 arsonists destroyed the Balboa Park Electrical Building, containing both the Air & Space Museum and the Hall of Fame. The blaze consumed the Hall of Fame's entire portrait gallery, incinerating more than 60 original paintings crafted to represent each inductee. Replacement of the portraits was overseen by the board of directors, who enlisted local artists and encouraged creative depictions of each figure in their era. Additionally, the board instructed the artists to include in each painting a representation of the figure's achievement, usually in the form of an aircraft or rocket, a practice which continues today.

After the fire, $4.5 million was the set goal for the San Diego Aerospace Museum and Hall of Fame Recovery Fund, a sum met in large part through contributions from aviation corporations and foundations, donations from private citizens, and support from the government. Though the Museum and Hall of Fame had planned to reopen triumphantly on 17 December 1978, the 75th anniversary of the Wright Brother's first successful flight, delays in renovation and aircraft delivery forced continual postponement of the opening date for over a year. Finally, exactly two years after the fire, the Hall of Fame reopened on 22 February 1980 in the historic Ford Building.

== Inductees ==
- Member (year of induction)
- Bossart, Karel J. "Charlie" (1965)
- von Braun, Wernher (1965)
- Cochran, Jacqueline "Jackie" (1965)
- Crossfield, A. Scott (1965)
- Curtiss, Glenn H. (1965)
- Johnson, Clarence L. (1965)
- Fleet, Reuben H. (1965)
- Lindbergh, Charles A. (1965)
- Loening, Grover (1965)
- Ryan, T. Claude (1965)
- Wright, Wilbur and Orville (1965)
- de la Cierva, Juan (1966)
- Ehricke, Krafft A. (1966)
- Doolittle Jr. James H. "Jimmy" (1966)
- Goddard, Robert H. (1966)
- Rickenbacker, Edward V. "Eddie" (1966)
- Rohr, Frederick H. (1966)
- Sikorsky, Igor I. (1966)
- Yeager, Charles E. "Chuck" (1966)
- Bishop, William A. (1967)
- Bleriot, Louis (1967)
- Douglas, Donald W. (1967)
- Earhart, Amelia (1967)
- Santos-Dumont, Alberto (1967)
- Whittle, Sir Frank (1967)
- Byrd, Richard E. (1968)
- Fink, Frank W. (1968)
- Glenn, John H. Jr. (1968)
- von Kármán, Theodore (1968)
- von Richthofen, Baron Manfred (1968)
- Waterman, Waldo D. (1968)
- Fokker, Anthony H. G. (1970)
- Gagarin, Yuri A. (1970)
- Mitchell, William E. "Billy" (1970)
- Schirra, Walter M. "Wally" Jr. (1970)
- Aldrin, Edwin E. "Buzz" (1971)
- Armstrong, Neil A. (1971)
- Collins, Michael (1971)
- Shepard, Alan B. Jr. (1971)
- Arnold, Henry H. "Hap" (1972)
- de Havilland, Geoffrey (1972)
- Lilienthal, Otto (1972)
- Northrop, John K. (1972)
- Dassault, Marcel (1973)
- Grumman, Leroy R. (1973)
- Towers, John. H. (1973)
- Chanute, Octave (1974)
- Cayley, Sir George (1974)
- Dryden, Hugh L. (1974)
- Allen, William M. "Bill" (1975)
- Laddon, Isaac M. "Mac" (1975)
- von Zeppelin, Count Ferdinand (1975)
- Balchen, Bernt (1976)
- Goddard, George W. (1976)
- Junkers, Hugo (1976)
- Kibalchich, Mykola (1976)
- MacReady, John A. (1976)
- Kindelberger, James H. (1977)
- Martin, Glenn L. (1977)
- Spaatz, Carl A. "Tooey" (1977)
- Trenchard, Hugh M. "Boom" (1977)
- LeMay, Curtis E. (1977)
- Messerschmitt, Willi E. (1979)
- Pickering, William H. (1979)
- Sopwith, Sir Thomas O. M. (1979)
- Sperry, Lawrence B. (1979)
- Breguet, Louis C. (1980)
- Oberth, Hermann (1980)
- Reeve, Robert C. (1980)
- Verdon-Roe, Sir Alliot (1980)
- Eaker, Ira C. (1981)
- Heinkel, Ernst (1981)
- Lear, William P. (1981)
- McDonnell, James S. (1981)
- Beech, Walter H. (1982)
- Heinemann, Edward H. (1982)
- von Ohain, Hans J.P. (1982)
- Trippe, Juan T. (1982)
- Caproni, Gianni (1983)
- Cessna, Clyde V. (1983)
- de Montgolfier, Joseph and Etienne (1983)
- Atwood, John L. (1984)
- Boeing, William E. (1984)
- Camm, Sir Sydney (1984)
- Dowding, Lord Hugh C. (1985)
- Lippisch, Alexander M. (1985)
- Ellehammer, Jacob C. (1986)
- Kingsford-Smith, Sir Charles Edward (1986)
- Mitchell, Reginald Joseph. (1986)
- Dornier, Claude (1987)
- Handley-Page, Sir Frederick (1987)
- Hughes, Howard R. (1987)
- Farmin, Henri (1988)
- Rutan, Elbert L. "Burt" (1988)
- Tupolev, Andrei (1988)
- Edwards, Sir George (1989)
- Mitscher, Marc A. (1989)
- Tsiolkovsky, Konstantin E. (1989)
- Korolyov, Sergey Pavlovich (1990)
- Anders, William A. (1990)
- Borman, Frank (1990)
- Lovell, James A. "Jim" Jr. (1990)
- Piccard, Auguste and Jean (1991)
- Schmued, Edgar (1991)
- Gilruth, Robert R. (1992)
- Link, Edwin A. Jr. (1992)
- Prandtl, Ludwig (1992)
- Focke, Henrich (1993)
- LeVier, Anthony W. "Tony" (1993)
- Piper, William T. (1993)
- Beech, Olive A. (1995)
- Jeppesen, Elrey B. (1995)
- Young, John W. (1995)
- Davis Jr. Benjamin O. (1996)
- Mikoyan, Artyom I. (1996)
- Smith, Cyrus R. (1996)
- Cobham, Sir Alan J. (1997)
- Poberezny, Paul H. (1997)
- Post, Wiley H. (1997)
- Short, Eustace and Oswald (1998)
- Concorde Test Pilots (1998)
- Whitcomb, Richard T. (1998)
- Antonov, Oleg K. (1999)
- Kaman, Charles H. (1999)
- Thaden, Louise M. (1999)
- Branson, Sir Richard (2000)
- Smith, Frederick W. (2000)
- Stinson, Katherine (2000)
- Apollo-Soyuz Test Project crew (2001)
- Bernoulli, Daniel (2002)
- Getting, Ivan (2002)
- Kelleher, Herbert D. (2002)
- Bell, Lawrence D. (2004)
- Hiller Jr. Stanley (2004)
- Martin, Sir James (2004)
- Frye, William "Jack" (2006)
- Ilyushin, Sergey V. (2006)
- Patterson, William (2006)
- Bera, Fran (2007)
- Cernan, Eugene (2007)
- Hoover, Robert A. "Bob" (2007)
- Wagstaff, Patty (2007)
- Zable, Walter J. (2007)
- Beyster, Dr. John Robert (2008)
- Cardenas, Robert (2008)
- Carpenter, Scott (2008)
- King, John and Martha (2008)
- Pisanos, Spiros "Steve" (2008)
- Tuskegee Airmen (2008)
- Blue Angels (2009)
- Lockheed Skunk Works (2009)
- Lacy, Clay (2009)
- Ride, Dr. Sally (2009)
- Robertson, Cliff (2009)
- Robinson, Frank D. (2009)
- Tucker, Sean D. (2009)
- Women Air Force Service Pilots (WASPs) (2009)
- Bean, Alan (2010)
- Blue, Linden (2010)
- Clark, Joseph (2010)
- Ford, Harrison (2010)
- Fossett, Steven J. (2010)
- Gildred, Theodore E. Jr. (2010)
- Gildred, Theodore E. Sr. (2010)
- Mitchell, Robert A. K. (2010)
- Robin, Seymour "Si" (2010)
- Coleman, Jerry (2011)
- Cunningham, Walter (2011)
- Gibbs, Bill (2011)
- Jacobs, Irwin Mark (2011)
- Poberezny, Tom (2011)
- Raisbeck, James (2011)
- Rutan, Richard Glenn "Dick" (2011)
- Naval Aviation (2011)
- Top Gun (2011)
- Apollo 9 crew (2012)
- Hilton, Barron (2012)
- McKinnon, Dan (2012)
- Marine Corps Aviation (100 years) (2012)
- Robertson, Harry (2012)
- Space Shuttle (2012)
- Wagner, Raymond (2012)
- Wilson, Bob (2012)
- Anderson, C.E. "Bud" (2013)
- Apollo 16 (2013)
- Bowen, Paul (2013)
- Crandall, Robert (2013)
- Laird, Dean "Diz" (2013)
- NASA Mission Control (2013)
- National Business Aviation Assn. (NBAA) (2013)
- Red Bull Stratos Project (2013)
- US Airways Flight 1549 Crew (2013)
- Boeing, Bill Jr. (2014)
- Coleman, Bessie (2014)
- Dailey, John (Jack) (2014)
- Engle, Joe (2014)
- Fulton, Fitz (2014)
- Ninety-Nines (2014)
- Schaufele, Roger (2014)
- WD-40 (2014)
- Cassidy, Tom & Pace, Frank (2015)
- Chana, Bill (2015)
- EAA & EAA Young Eagles (2015)
- Ferry, Bob (2015)
- Friedkin, Kenneth (2015)
- Johnson, Sam (2015)
- Mulally, Alan (2015)
- Trapnell, Fred (2015)
- AOPA (2016)
- Boeing Companies (2016)
- Hinton Family of Air Racers (2016)
- Maloney Family of Air Racers (2016)
- Myers, Dale (2016)
- Non-Scheduled Airlines (2016)
- ORBIS Eye Hospital (2016)
- Worden, Al (2016)
- AIAA (2017)
- Atlas Rocket Program (2017)
- Drake, Hudson (2017)
- Embry-Riddle Golden Eagle Flight Team (2017)
- Herrington, John (2017)
- McAuliffe, Christa (2017)
- Montgomery, John J. (2017)
- Vought, Chance (2017)
- Whitman, Bruce N. (2018)
- Air Charity Network (2018)
- Bong, Richard (2018)
- Corporate Angels Network (2018)
- Newton, Gen. Lloyd “Fig” (2018)
- Ochoa, Ellen (2018)
- Tilden, Brad (2018)
- Whitson, Peggy (2018)
- Bezos, Jeff (2019)
- Bowlus, Hawley (2019)
- Coffman, Vance D (2019)
- Garrett, Joan Sullivan (2019)
- Gilliland, Robert (2019)
- Gordon, Richard "Dick" (2019)
- Hoffman, Col. David (2019)
- Liebeck, Robert H (2019)
- Barrett, Barbara (2020)
- Shults, Tammie Jo (2020)
- Bolen, Ed (2021)
- Collins, Elieen (2021)
- Commemorative Air Force (2021)
- Duke, Charles (2021)
- FedEx (2021)
- Moss, Bryan (2021)
- O'Hara, Dee (2021)
- Army Aviation (2022)
- Cutter Aviation (2022)
- General Aviation Manufacturers GAMA (2022)
- Herman, Michael (2022)
- Keating, Brian (2022)
- Pedersen, Dan (2022)
- Textron Aviation (2022)

== See also ==
- United States Astronaut Hall of Fame
