= Bruce N. Whitman =

American aviation industry professional (1933–2018)

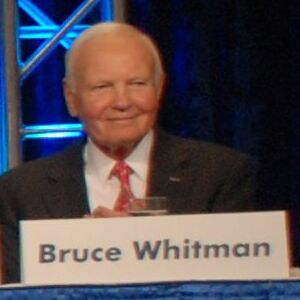
- Whitman in 2008
- Born: August 4, 1933; New York City
- Died: October 10, 2018 (aged 85); Greenwich, Connecticut
- Known for: Aviation
- Notable work
- Military career
- Allegiance: United States of America
- Branch: United States Air Force

Bruce N. Whitman (August 4, 1933 – October 10, 2018) was an aviation industry professional and CEO of FlightSafety International. In 2014, he was awarded the Lifetime Aviation Industry Leader Award by the Living Legends of Aviation. On 23 March 2017, he received an award by the Medal of Honor Society. On 3 October 2018, he was inducted into the International Air & Space Hall of Fame. Whitman was also the 2018 recipient of the Philip J. Klass Award for Lifetime Achievement.

== Early life ==
Whitman graduated Trinity College in Hartford, Connecticut in 1955 and served in the United States Air Force as a pilot, navigator and bombardier. In 1957, he served as Assistant to the Commander, Homestead Air Force Base.
