= Wright Brothers Master Pilot Award =

The Wright Brothers Master Pilot Award was instituted by the United States Federal Aviation Administration (FAA) on October 11, 2003, to recognize pilots who have practiced safe flight operations continuously for 50 or more years during the course of their aviation careers. The award consists of a certificate and a pin, and consolidates other aviation awards presented by the FAA district offices. Eligibility for the award includes:

- Must be a citizen or permanent resident of the United States during the entire 50-year period covered
- 50 years of piloting experience, dating to the applicant's first solo flight, during which the pilot must have been certified by either the FAA or the United States Civil Aviation Authority.

Nominations are submitted by a formal application form that must be accompanied by three letters of recommendation from other FAA-certified pilots, attesting to the nominee's record. Photocopies of required certifications and documentations also must accompany the application. As of 2026, over 10,000 certified pilots have been honored with the award.
