= Suzanne Asbury-Oliver =

Female professional skywriter

- Born: Suzanne Asbury c. 1958; Forest Grove, Oregon, United States
- Occupation: Aviator
- Spouse: Steven Oliver

Suzanne Asbury-Oliver (née Asbury; born c. 1958) is an American aviator who, with her husband Steven Oliver, became America's only husband and wife professional skywriting and aerobatic team. Asbury-Oliver aviated for PepsiCo and now has her own skywriting company, Olivers Flying Circus. She estimated that in a typical year, she writes 500 sky messages in over 150 locations nationwide.

== Early life ==
Suzanne Asbury was born in Forest Grove, Oregon. She began flying gliders at 14. By 15, she flew her first solo mission.

== Career ==
Around age 18, she was a professional aviator and had already earned her powered-aircraft instrument rating, commercial certificate, flight instructor and instrument-flight instructor certificates, and a multiengine rating. She had become an aviation professional and begun skywriting for Pepsi in the 1980s. She obtained an Airline Transport Pilot (ATP) Certification. She later married Steven Oliver, with whom she went into skywriting as a team.
