= Zoe Dell Nutter =

American dancer (1915–2020)

- Born: Zoe Dell Lantis; June 14, 1915; Yamhill, Oregon, US
- Died: April 22, 2020 (aged 104); Beavercreek Township, Ohio, US
- Occupations: Dancer; actress; model; businesswoman; commercial pilot
- Spouse: Ervin J. Nutter (m. 1965; died 2000)

Zoe Dell Lantis Nutter (June 14, 1915 – April 22, 2020) was an American dancer, actress and model who became a promoter, educator, marketer, commercial pilot, and philanthropist.

== Biography ==
Lantis was born in Yamhill, Oregon in 1915. She received early encouragement in public performing. Her family lived next door to a dance teacher, so Lantis did odd jobs to become her student. After high school, she moved to San Francisco, where soon she was dancing for the San Francisco Ballet and in nightclubs.

After one 1939 show, aviation executives approached her about promoting commercial aviation at the Golden Gate International Exposition on nearby Treasure Island, to promote air travel in general, and overseas flights to East Asia in particular, via the new China Clipper flying boats based at Treasure Island.

Dressed in a pirate costume, she served as the official hostess for the exposition. Soon she had flown 100,000 passenger miles to meet mayors and governors across the U.S., demonstrating the safety and comforts of air travel.

In the middle of a campaign against burlesque theaters, New York mayor Fiorello LaGuardia insisted she wear her coat over her skimpy costume in order to be photographed with him. The story took off and soon she was labeled the "most photographed woman in the world," appearing in Life on February 7, 1938.

After a short film career with Paramount Pictures, she joined the United Service Organizations to entertain troops during World War II. Surgery ended her dancing career.

A friend suggested she pursue flying along with her first husband, with whom she earned her pilot certification. Moving to northern California after the war, she regularly flew into San Francisco to go shopping. In 1958, she represented Standard Oil of California at the Expo 58 World's Fair in Brussels, Belgium, and continued to promote commercial air travel around the world.

In the early 1960s, she took a job with Piper Aircraft, Inc., one of the main manufacturers of private airplanes. President William T. Piper, known as the Henry Ford of aviation for making inexpensive, simple to operate, aircraft, wanted her to be his spokesperson for general aviation, as she had been for commercial aviation. She demonstrated aircraft and sold flight training for Piper's subsidiary Monarch Aviation, which operated a base and flight school in Monterey, California. She soon learned to avoid flying over nearby mountains due to insufficient engine power. Among her responsibilities was to make flying accessible to ladies, to teach women to be able to read a map, handle the radio or land the plane in event of an emergency.

Her work helped improve flight safety and train the increasing numbers of private pilots. In addition, while in Monterey, she helped found the local chapter of the Ninety-Nines, the Organization of Licensed Women Pilots.

When Piper needed a cheaper trainer plane, she flew to Dayton, Ohio to evaluate a new plane there. Local businessman Ervin J. Nutter, who built parts for the plane, assisted her. After three trips, she turned down the aircraft, but married Nutter, and moved to Ohio in 1965.

Nutter ran the Elano Corporation, which made tubing and engine components for the aerospace industry. Her flying experience and marketing background complemented her husband's technical expertise. Soon she was directing promotions of the Small Aircraft Division and serving as one of the company pilots.

Elano developed a stainless steel manifold that boosted the performance of diesel locomotive engines for General Electric. Given her experience flying over the mountains in California, she believed a better manifold would give pilots more power in the air. She interviewed several engineers before hiring John Warlick, working with him to define the problem through promotion of the finished product. Despite initial rejections by all aircraft engine manufacturers, the manifold eventually became standard equipment on many models. In addition to adding power, the manifold reduced engine maintenance for annual inspections, and enabled a quieter, better-heated cockpit.

As a pilot, she logged over 2,000 flight hours, earning commercial, instrument and multi-engine ratings. She delivered rush jobs for Elano-20 minutes to the airport, ten minutes to preflight, an hour's flight to Cincinnati and Columbus, and within a couple hours a part could be delivered to Boston, Chicago or Atlanta.

She joined the Ohio Civil Air Patrol, flying search and rescue missions, and became active in the National Aviation Hall of Fame, with 12 years service as a board member, serving as its first woman president in 1988. Nutter served on many charitable, educational and civic boards, such as the San Francisco Aeronautical Society. and the Ohio Humanities Council. She turned 100 in June 2015 and died at her home in Beavercreek Township, Ohio on April 22, 2020.

== Quotes ==
Get out there with what you've got, because you never know how you'll get to use it.

The most dangerous part of flying is the trip to the airport.

In all the years I flew, I never lost my luggage, and I've never lost my lunch.

Few women can claim to be a dancer, a model, a huntress, an aviator, a philanthropist and a pirate ... Zoe Dell Lantis Nutter is one of them.

— First Lady Laura Bush in 2006

== Awards ==
- First recipient of Wright State University's Spirit of Innovation Award.
- Deeds-Kettering Award for outstanding contributions to the Engineers Club of Dayton
- Ford's Theatre's Lincoln Medal
- A 2009 recipient of the Bob Hoover Freedom of Flight Award

== See also ==
- E.J. Nutter Training Facility
- Nutter Center

== Notes and references ==
- Zoe Dell Lantis Nutter: A 70-Year Commitment to Aviation's Success." by Carol L. Osborne, Airport Journals July 2009
