= King Schools, Inc. =

American Pilot Training Software

- Company type: Private
- Industry: Pilot training courses and software
- Founded: 1974 (52 years ago)
- Founders: John and Martha King
- Headquarters: San Diego, California, U.S.
- Area served: Worldwide
- Key people: Barry Knuttila, CEO
- Number of employees: 70 (May 2010)
- Website: KingSchools.com

King Schools, Inc. is an American computer software company headquartered in San Diego, California. The company focuses on the creation of Computer Based Training (CBT) or e-learning to assist individuals in obtaining all levels of pilot certification in the United States. Over the years, the company has expanded its training courses to cover the various pilot certificates, ratings and educational requirements, along with many aeronautical elective studies. More recently, it has begun offering all of its courses in web-based training (WBT) and mobile device formats.

King Schools was founded in 1974 by John and Martha King, husband and wife. As Certified Flight Instructors, the Kings first began as a traveling ground school, offering two-day courses in various cities. A little more than a decade later, they began producing training videos that other flight instructors could incorporate into their own curriculum. Eventually, demand for their videos by individuals learning to fly led to the development of courses that could be used for self-paced study.

As of May 2010, King Schools has over 70 employees and operates exclusively from an 18,000-square-foot (1,700 m^{2}) facility near Montgomery Field (KMYF) in San Diego. Course development, production, customer service and shipping all occur at this location. Course videos are filmed either in the in-house digital studio or at nearby Montgomery Field.

John and Martha King are two of the most recognized experts in flight instruction, and King Schools is best known for its effective use of a folksy, humor-rich approach in their training videos. The company claims that more than half of all pilots in the United States have studied using one of their courses. Of the courses they offer, the Private Pilot Knowledge Test Course is likely the most used, supporting FAA Part 61 ground schools. Among the approximately 90 other courses offered, topics covered include Private Pilot, Instrument Pilot, Commercial Pilot, International Operations and risk management. King Schools also produces the Cessna-branded courses used by Cessna Pilot Centers, which are Part 141 ground schools.

== History ==
- In 1975, King Schools, Inc. was started by John and Martha King as a touring two-day ground school.
- In 1989, King Schools moves to its current facility in San Diego, near Montgomery Field
- In 1999, King Schools produces the flight training videos for Microsoft Flight Simulator 2000, featuring John and Martha King providing personal instruction for virtual pilots. They also did the same for Microsoft Flight Simulator 2002, in 2001.

In 2008, the Kings were inducted into the International Air & Space Hall of Fame at the San Diego Air & Space Museum, and in 2019, they were inducted into the National Aviation Hall of Fame at the National Museum of the United States Air Force.

== Flying risk awareness advocacy ==
In March 2001, Flying magazine published an interview with John King titled "John King's Crusade to Change Aviation's Culture." In the article, John openly charged the general-aviation industry with mischaracterizing that light aircraft could be considered safe. He argued that general aviation pilots were insufficiently trained to recognize and address flight hazards. King Schools later joined efforts with Avemco Insurance to produce a training video to do this. In 2003, this led to the first in a series of training videos marketed by King Schools as a "Practical Risk Management" course.
