= Joe Clark (aeronautics) =

American aviator and entrepreneur (1941–2020)

Joe Clark (September 9, 1941 – March 30, 2020) was a Canadian-born American aerospace pioneer. He co-founded Horizon Air in 1981.

He founded an early dealership for the Learjet, one of the first private business jets, in the 1960s. Later, in the 1990s, he co-founded a company, Aviation Partners, to design and sell winglets which enhanced performance of airplane wings at their tips, reducing drag. It has been estimated that the technology developed, applied to Boeing 737s and other planes, has saved more than 10 billion gallons of fuel, saving money, extending range, and avoiding carbon emissions.

He was a Living Legends of Aviation honoree, inducted in 2004 as "Aviation Entrepreneur of the Year" and in 2009 as "Lifetime Aviation Entrepreneur".

He was "a generous (though low-profile) philanthropist and trustee of the Seattle Museum of Flight and other aviation causes, but also supported nonprofits doing work with children and people who are homeless."

Clark died at a hospital near his home in Palm Springs, California, on March 30, 2020, after suffering a fall two days before.

== Legacy ==
For his life long dedication to aviation Clark was inducted into the National Aviation Hall of Fame alongside the class of 2022.
