= John Leahy (executive) =

American businessman (born 1950)

- Born: August 1950 (age 76); New York City, New York, U.S.
- Education: Fordham University (B.A.); Syracuse University (M.B.A.)
- Occupation: Businessman
- Spouse: Grace Leahy
- Children: 3

John Leahy (born August 1950) is an American businessman. He is a former chief operating officer–Customers at Airbus (2005–2017), as well as the company's chief commercial officer between August 1994 and 2017, and a former member of the Airbus main board of management. Well known as one of the commercial aviation industry's most prolific aircraft salesmen, he made a significant contribution to the increase in Airbus's market share, from 18% in 1993 to 57% a decade later. He is responsible for over $1 trillion in sales.

== Biography ==
Leahy has an MBA from Syracuse University and a BA from Fordham University. He is a licensed multi-engine commercial pilot and is a former flight instructor with nearly 4,000 hours of flying time. He flew cargo across the Great Lakes. From 1977 to 1984, Leahy worked in marketing at Piper Aircraft.

Leahy joined Airbus North America in January 1985, becoming head of sales soon after. He was appointed president of Airbus North America in 1988 with responsibility for the penetration of the strategic North American market, where most major U.S. airlines were Boeing and McDonnell Douglas customers.

His first deal was selling A320s to Northwest Airlines, which was a Boeing customer which was then the risk averse choice. When regular Boeing customer United Airlines bought the A320, this prompted Boeing to update the slower, shorter-range 737 Classic-400 into the more efficient, longer 737NG-800. Similar to loaning four A300B2 to Eastern Airlines for a test run before Leahy, selling 25 A300-600s to American required walk-away leases with little or no penalty at the return, and Boeing had to offer the same to place its 767-300ER. To feed its New York and Miami hubs, Pan Am replaced its Boeing 727s by A320s but when it collapsed, lessor GPA placed them to Braniff, which then collapsed, America West Airlines took them, went through bankruptcy, and became its largest operator with US Airways and later acquired American Airlines which ordered 400 A320s. In 1993–1994, Boeing struck exclusive supplier contracts for 20 years to eliminate competition and bind American, Continental, Delta, United and Southwest: the deal was ruled illegal when Boeing and McDonnell Douglas merged three years later, but was honored nonetheless.

In 1994, Leahy was appointed chief commercial officer at the main office of Airbus, the position of the sales chief which was previously allocated to a Briton. In this capacity, he has outlasted five Airbus CEOs, and seven Boeing sales chiefs.

Leahy set the goal of 50% market share by 2000 from low-double digits then in a little over five years. He presented this goal to the board in January 1995, for which this was out of reach, targeting 25% to 30%. He achieved 18% in 1995 and then Boeing Commercial Airplanes president Ron Woodard was determined to crush Airbus by cutting prices and offering early delivery slots: the 737 production rose from 21 a month to 27, unprecedented at the time, but the supply chain couldn't keep up and the line was shut down for 30 days to catch up, causing Boeing's first loss in 40 years as Woodard lost his job. Douglas failed in its strategy of being a small player taking small, profitable deals which lasted about three years : by 1997, it was down to a 7% market share and was absorbed by Boeing. Airbus reached 50% in 1999. It maintained over 50% market share including deliveries until 2005.

Leahy is also known in the industry as a polarizing figure. Former Boeing sales chief Toby Bright said "John was the guy that at Boeing we loved to hate and we blamed him for a lot of the losses that we experienced against him".

Leahy was instrumental in the launch of the new Airbus flagship, the A380-800 passenger aircraft. With its introduction with Singapore Airlines in October 2007, the A380 has become the largest airliner in the world, surpassing the Boeing 747. He is also leading the sales campaign for the all-new A350, with the challenge to regain ground lost to the Boeing 787 Dreamliner and Boeing 777.

The first signs of his job taking its toll on him appeared in autumn 2006, when he had to undergo heart surgery. At the time, doctors advised him to slow his work pace.

He was supposed to retire at the end of 2017 to be replaced by his deputy Kiran Rao. Rao stepped down and Eric Schulz, aerospace engineer and president of Rolls-Royce plc Civil Aerospace, replaced Leahy in January 2018.

== See also ==
- Fabrice Brégier
- Tom Enders
