= Marc Parent (executive) =

French Canadian business executive

Marc Parent CM
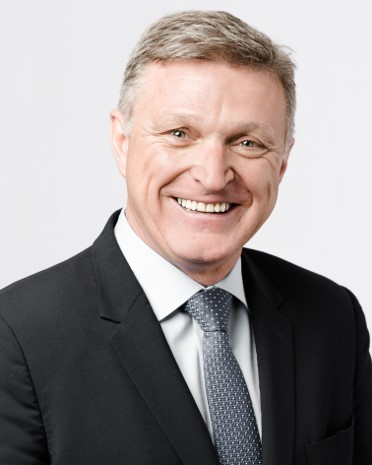
- Born: February 5, 1961 (age 65); Verdun, Quebec (now Montreal), Canada
- Education: (B.Eng.)
- Alma mater: École Polytechnique de Montréal
- Years active: 1984-present
- Board member of: Telus; McGill University Health Centre Foundation
- Awards: Order of Canada

Marc Parent CM (born February 5, 1961) is a French-Canadian business executive, mechanical engineer, and philanthropist. He is the former CEO of CAE Inc., a position he held until August 2025. He also serves on the board of directors for Telus and McGill University Health Centre Foundation.

== Early life and education ==
Marc Parent was born in Verdun, Quebec. At the age of 12, he joined the 51st Air Cadet squadron in Ottawa. He later switched to the 783 Air Cadet squadron in Montreal and obtained his pilot's license through the Air Cadets at the age of 17.

Parent attended Polytechnique Montréal where he graduated in 1984 with a bachelor's degree in mechanical engineering. In 2012, he received an honorary doctorate from the same institution. Parent is also a graduate of the Harvard Business School's Advanced Management Program.

== Career ==
=== Canadair and Bombardier ===
Parent began his career as an aerospace engineer with Canadair in 1984, starting as an engineer on the Challenger and Canadair Regional Jet (CRJ) programs. He continued working on these programs following the sale of Canadair to Bombardier in 1986. In 1987, he became manager of the Challenger's mechanical systems group, with the mandate of fixing the aircraft's teething problems. In 1990, he was made head of Program Management for the CRJ aircraft flight test program at the Bombardier flight testing and certification center in Wichita, Kansas. In 1993, Parent was promoted to project director for the Challenger 604.

Following Bombardier's acquisition of de Havilland Canada, Parent was put in charge of the De Havilland Canada Dash 8-400 program. He was made Bombardier's Vice President of Program Management in 1998, making him responsible for all of Bombardier's aircraft development programs, including the Global Express, the Learjet 45, the CRJ, and the Challenger 300.

From 2000 to 2004, Parent held various executive positions within Bombardier. He was promoted to Vice President of Operations for the company's De Havilland facility in Toronto, Canada, and in 2001, he was named vice president and general manager of operations for the same facility, responsible for Q100/200/300/400 and Global Express aircraft programs. He became the vice president and general manager, U.S. operations in 2003. In 2004, Parent returned to Bombardier's Montreal facility where he became the vice president and general manager of the Challenger 300, Challenger 604, 850/870, and CRJ-200 aircraft programs.

=== CAE Inc. ===
In February 2005, Parent joined CAE to take on the role of Group President of Simulation Products. In 2006, he was promoted to Group President of Simulation Products and Military Training & Services and in 2008 promoted to executive vice president and chief operating officer, joining the company's board of directors the same year. Parent became president and CEO of the company in October 2009.

With the shortages of Personal Protective Equipment (PPE) for healthcare workers and ventilators in Canada at the onset of the COVID-19 pandemic, and the loss of revenue caused due to travel restrictions related to the pandemic, Parent shifted CAE's focus towards helping Canada's COVID-19 response. Under Parent's leadership, CAE developed the CAE Air1™ ventilator, signing a contract with the Government of Canada to manufacture and supply 10,000 ventilators. In 2021, Parent led the charge in a mobilization effort with many large Quebec and Canadian companies to work with the government so they could expedite the vaccination effort by opening their own "vaccination hubs" for employees. CAE's vaccination centre opened in April 2021 and administered over 33,000 doses of vaccine.

During his time as CEO of CAE, the company became the first carbon neutral Canadian aerospace company, and in November 2022, CAE was voted as one of Canada's top employers. Company revenue also doubled to $4.3 billion during his time as CEO. In 2024, Parent announced he would be retiring from CAE and left his role in the company in August 2025.

=== Other corporate activities ===
Parent chaired the board for Aero Montreal, Quebec's aerospace cluster, from 2008 until 2010. He is a past board member and chair for the Aerospace Industries Association of Canada (AIAC). He also served as a member of the board of directors and executive committee for the Canadian Association of Defence and Security Industries (CADSI).

As of 2025, Parent serves on the board of directors of Telus and the McGill University Health Centre Foundation. He also served on the Business Council of Canada.

== Philanthropy ==
Parent is a trustee of the Lakefield College School Foundation, and is a member of the Council of Governors for the greater Montreal branch of the United Way Centraide Canada Organization. In 2013, he joined Michael E. Roach as co-president of the Centraide Cabinet de Campagne.

In 2019, Parent made a donation of $3 million to Lakefield College School for the construction of a new student residence. The new residence was named "Parent House" in his honor. In 2019, he joined Jean Raby as co-president of the Musée des beaux-arts de Montréal (MBAM) Ball.

In 2020, Parent made a $100,000 donation to the McGill University Health Centre (MUHC) Foundation. The funds were used to support research using the Biobanque québécoise de la COVID-19 (BQC19). In 2020, he joined Suzanne Legge Orr and Jean Charest as co-chairs of the MUHC Foundation's Dream Big campaign.

== Personal life ==
Parent is an active pilot, holding an Airline Transport Pilot ratings from Transport Canada. He was named a member of the Order of Canada in 2020 and inducted into the Québec Air and Space Hall of Fame in 2022. He was also named a Knight of the Ordre national du Québec in 2022.
