= List of awards and nominations received by Harrison Ford =

Harrison Ford awards and nominations
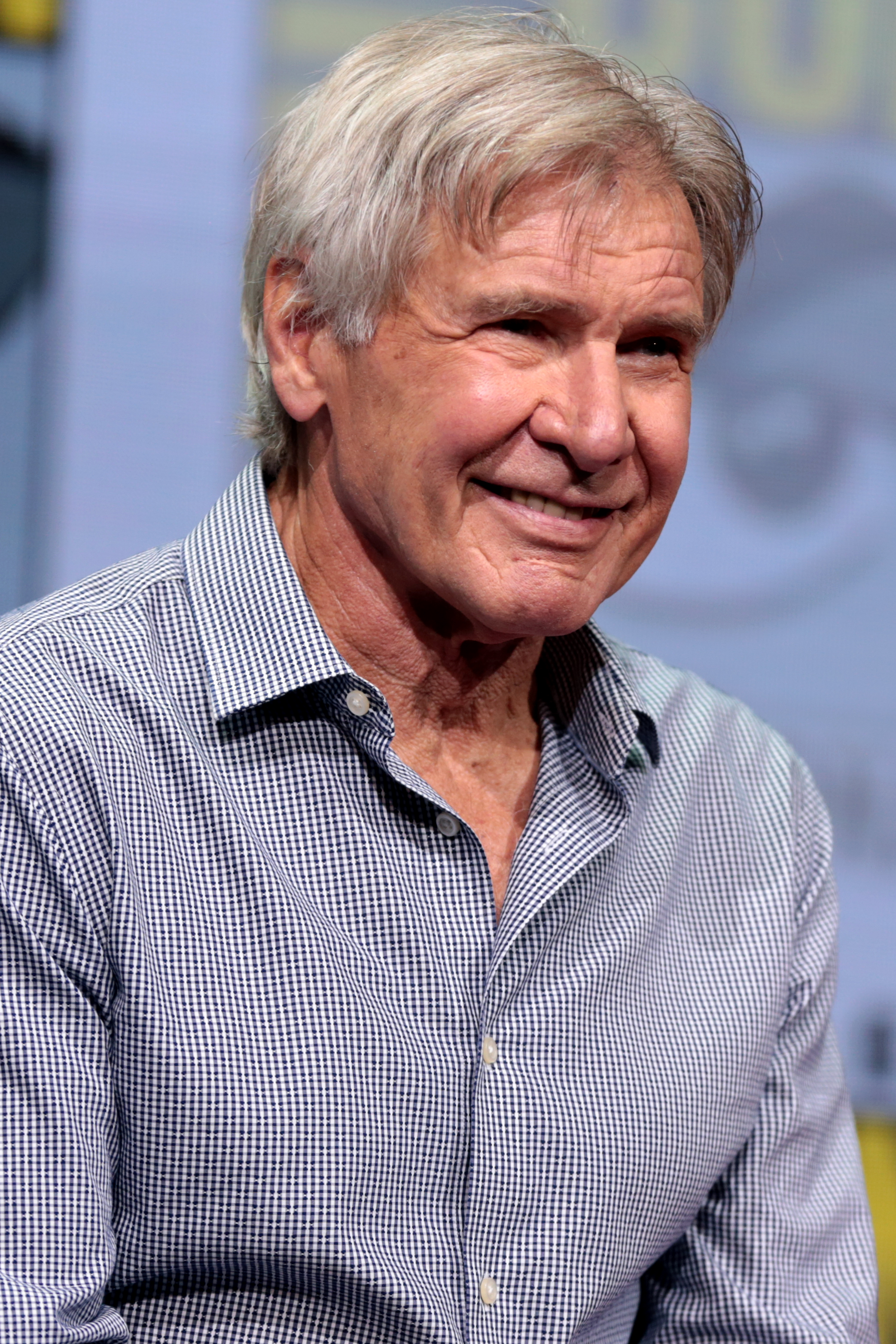
- Ford at the 2017 San Diego Comic-Con
Awards and nominations
Award	Wins	Nominations
Academy Awards	0	1
Actor Awards	0	2
BAFTA Awards	0	1
César Awards	1	1
Golden Globes	0	5
Primetime Emmy Awards	0	2

Totals (Note: Certain award groups do not simply award one winner. They acknowledge several different recipients, have runners-up, and have third place. Since this is a specific recognition and is different from losing an award, runner-up mentions are considered wins in this award tally. For simplification and to avoid errors, each award in this list has been presumed to have had a prior nomination.)
- Wins: 38
- Nominations: 83

Harrison Ford is an American actor. He is known for his leading man roles across various genres, such as action, science fiction, drama and romance films. He has received numerous accolades throughout his career, including nominations for an Academy Award, a BAFTA Award, five Golden Globes, two Primetime Emmy Awards, and two SAG-AFTRA's Actor Awards.

In his seven decades-long acting career, Ford has played multiple iconic cinematic characters, including Han Solo in the Star Wars saga (1977–2017), Indiana Jones in the titular film franchise (1981–2023), and Rick Deckard in two of the Blade Runner films (1982–2017). For the aforementioned portrayals, he has received several wins and nominations at the Saturn Awards, winning Best Actor for Raiders of the Lost Ark (1981), Star Wars: The Force Awakens (2015), and Indiana Jones and the Dial of Destiny (2023).

He received critical acclaim for his performance as Sergeant John Book in the thriller film Witness (1985), for which he was nominated for the Academy Award for Best Actor and the corresponding prize at the BAFTA Awards and Golden Globe Awards. He received further Golden Globe nominations for playing a stubborn inventor in the drama The Mosquito Coast (1986), a man falsely accused of murder in the thriller The Fugitive (1993), and a workaholic businessman in the romantic comedy Sabrina (1995).

On television, he took the role of Dr. Paul Rhoades, a senior therapist in the Apple TV comedy series Shrinking (2023–present). Ford was praised for his comedic performance, earning nominations for the Actor Award for Outstanding Performance by a Male Actor in a Comedy Series and the Primetime Emmy Award for Outstanding Supporting Actor in a Comedy Series.

Ford has received numerous accolades for his career achievements, which include the AFI Life Achievement Award, the Golden Globe Cecil B. DeMille Award, a Motion Picture Star on the Hollywood Walk of Fame, an Honorary César, the Britannia Award for Worldwide Contribution to Entertainment, the Cannes Film Festival's Honorary Palme d'Or, and the Screen Actors Guild Life Achievement Award. He is also a licensed pilot and has won various awards honoring achievements in the aerospace industry, such as the Wright Brothers Memorial Trophy.

== Awards and nominations ==
Award	Year (Note: Indicates the year of ceremony.)	Nominated work	Category	Result	Ref.
Academy Awards	1986	Witness	Best Actor	Nominated	
AARP Movies for Grownups Awards	2009	Indiana Jones and the Kingdom of the Crystal Skull	Best Grownup Love Story (Note: Shared with Karen Allen.)	Nominated	
Actor Awards	2025	Shrinking	Outstanding Performance by a Male Actor in a Comedy Series	Nominated	
Actor Awards	2025	Shrinking	Outstanding Performance by an Ensemble in a Comedy Series	Nominated	
Actor Awards	2026	—N/a	Life Achievement Award	Won	
AFI Awards	2000	—N/a	Life Achievement Award	Won	
American Society of Cinematographers Awards	2012	—N/a	Board of the Governors Award	Won	
Astra TV Awards	2024	1923	Best Actor in a Streaming Drama Series	Nominated	
Astra TV Awards	2024	Shrinking	Best Supporting Actor in a Streaming Comedy Series	Nominated	
Astra TV Awards	2025	Shrinking	Best Supporting Actor in a Comedy Series	Won	
Astra TV Awards	2026	Shrinking	Best Supporting Actor in a Comedy Series	Won	
Bambi Awards	1997	Air Force One	Best International Actor	Won	
Blockbuster Entertainment Awards	1995	Clear and Present Danger	Favorite Actor in an Action/Adventure/Thriller – Theatrical	Won	
Blockbuster Entertainment Awards	1995	The Fugitive	Favorite Actor in an Action/Adventure/Thriller – Video	Won	
Blockbuster Entertainment Awards	1998	Air Force One	Favorite Actor in an Action/Adventure	Nominated	
Blockbuster Entertainment Awards	1999	Six Days, Seven Nights	Favorite Actor in a Comedy/Romance	Won	
Blockbuster Entertainment Awards	1999	Air Force One	Favorite Actor – Video	Nominated	
Blockbuster Entertainment Awards	2001	What Lies Beneath	Favorite Actor in a Suspense	Won	
Bravo Otto Awards	1984	—N/a	Best Actor	Won	
Britannia Awards	2015	—N/a	Worldwide Contribution to Entertainment	Won	
BAFTA Awards	1986	Witness	Best Actor in a Leading Role	Nominated	
Cannes Film Festival Awards	2023	—N/a	Honorary Palme d'Or	Won	
César Awards	2010	—N/a	Honorary César	Won	
CinemaCon Awards	2013	—N/a	Lifetime Achievement Award	Won	
Critics' Choice Awards	2024	—N/a	Career Achievement Award	Won	
Critics' Choice Awards	2024	Shrinking	Best Supporting Actor in a Comedy Series	Nominated	
Dorian Awards	2026	Shrinking	Best Supporting TV Performance – Comedy	Nominated	
Golden Apple Awards	1993	—N/a	Male Star of the Year	Won	
Golden Globes	1986	Witness	Best Actor in a Motion Picture – Drama	Nominated	
Golden Globes	1987	The Mosquito Coast	Best Actor in a Motion Picture – Drama	Nominated	
Golden Globes	1994	The Fugitive	Best Actor in a Motion Picture – Drama	Nominated	
Golden Globes	1996	Sabrina	Best Actor in a Motion Picture – Musical or Comedy	Nominated	
Golden Globes	2002	—N/a	Cecil B. DeMille Award	Won	
Golden Globes	2025	Shrinking	Best Supporting Actor – Television	Nominated	
Golden Raspberry Awards	2021	The Call of the Wild	Worst Screen Combo (Note: Credited as "Harrison Ford and that Totally Fake-Looking CGI Dog".)	Nominated	
Hollywood Film Awards	2013	—N/a	Hollywood Career Achievement Award	Won	
Jules Verne Awards	2006	—N/a	Spirit of Nature	Won	
Jupiter Awards	1981	Raiders of the Lost Ark	Best International Actor	Won	
Jupiter Awards	1984	Indiana Jones and the Temple of Doom	Best International Actor	Won	
Kansas City Film Critics Circle Awards	1985	Witness	Best Actor	Won	
Locarno Film Festival Awards	2011	—N/a	Lifetime Achievement Award	Won	
MTV Movie & TV Awards	1994	The Fugitive	Best Male Performance	Nominated	
MTV Movie & TV Awards	1994	The Fugitive	Best On-Screen Duo (Note: Shared with Tommy Lee Jones.)	Won	
MTV Movie & TV Awards	1998	Air Force One	Best Fight (Note: Shared with Gary Oldman.)	Nominated	
National Film Awards	2016	—N/a	Global Contribution to Motion Picture	Nominated	
National Movie Awards	2008	Indiana Jones and the Kingdom of the Crystal Skull	Best Male Performance	Nominated	
Nickelodeon Kids' Choice Awards	2025	Captain America: Brave New World	Favorite Villain	Nominated	
People's Choice Awards	1998	—N/a	Favorite Motion Picture Actor	Won	
People's Choice Awards	1999	—N/a	Favorite All Time Motion Picture Star	Won	
People's Choice Awards	2000	—N/a	Favorite Motion Picture Actor	Won	
People's Choice Awards	2009	—N/a	Favorite Male Movie Star	Nominated	
People's Choice Awards	2009	Indiana Jones and the Kingdom of the Crystal Skull	Favorite On-Screen Match-Up (Note: Shared with Shia LaBeouf.)	Nominated	
People's Choice Awards	2012	—N/a	Favorite Movie Icon	Nominated	
Primetime Emmy Awards	2025	Shrinking	Outstanding Supporting Actor in a Comedy Series	Nominated	
Primetime Emmy Awards	2026	Shrinking	Outstanding Supporting Actor in a Comedy Series	Nominated	
St. Louis Film Critics Association Awards	2013	42	Best Supporting Actor	Nominated	
San Francisco Film Critics Circle Awards	2013	42	Best Supporting Actor	Nominated	
San Francisco International Film Festival Awards	2013	—N/a	Peter J. Owens Award	Won	
Santa Barbara International Film Festival Awards	2011	—N/a	Kirk Douglas Award for Excellence in Film	Won	
Satellite Awards	2014	42	Best Supporting Actor – Motion Picture	Nominated	
Satellite Awards	2024	1923	Best Actor in a Television Series – Drama or Genre	Nominated	
Saturn Awards	1978	Star Wars	Best Actor	Nominated	
Saturn Awards	1982	Raiders of the Lost Ark	Best Actor	Won	
Saturn Awards	1985	Indiana Jones and the Temple of Doom	Best Actor	Nominated	
Saturn Awards	1991	Indiana Jones and the Last Crusade	Best Actor	Nominated	
Saturn Awards	1996	—N/a	Lifetime Achievement Award	Won	
Saturn Awards	2009	Indiana Jones and the Kingdom of the Crystal Skull	Best Actor	Nominated	
Saturn Awards	2012	Cowboys & Aliens	Best Supporting Actor	Nominated	
Saturn Awards	2014	Ender's Game	Best Supporting Actor	Nominated	
Saturn Awards	2016	Star Wars: The Force Awakens	Best Actor	Won	
Saturn Awards	2018	Blade Runner 2049	Best Supporting Actor	Nominated	
Saturn Awards	2024	Indiana Jones and the Dial of Destiny	Best Actor	Won	
Scream Awards	2007	—N/a	Hero Award	Won	
Scream Awards	2008	Indiana Jones and the Kingdom of the Crystal Skull	Best Science Fiction Actor	Nominated	
Scream Awards	2011	Cowboys & Aliens	Best Science Fiction Actor	Nominated	
Stinkers Bad Movie Awards	1979	The Frisco Kid	Worst On-Screen Couple (Note: Shared with Gene Wilder.)	Nominated	
Stinkers Bad Movie Awards	2003	K-19: The Widowmaker	Worst Fake Accent – Male	Won	
TCA Awards	2023	Shrinking	Individual Achievement in Comedy	Nominated	
TCA Awards	2025	Shrinking	Individual Achievement in Comedy	Nominated	
TCA Awards	2026	Shrinking	Individual Achievement in Comedy	Nominated	
Teen Choice Awards	2008	Indiana Jones and the Kingdom of the Crystal Skull	Choice Movie Actor: Action/Adventure	Nominated	
Young Hollywood Awards	2003	—N/a	Role Model Award	Won	
Zurich Film Festival Awards	2013	—N/a	Golden Eye for Lifetime Achievement	Won	

== Other honors ==
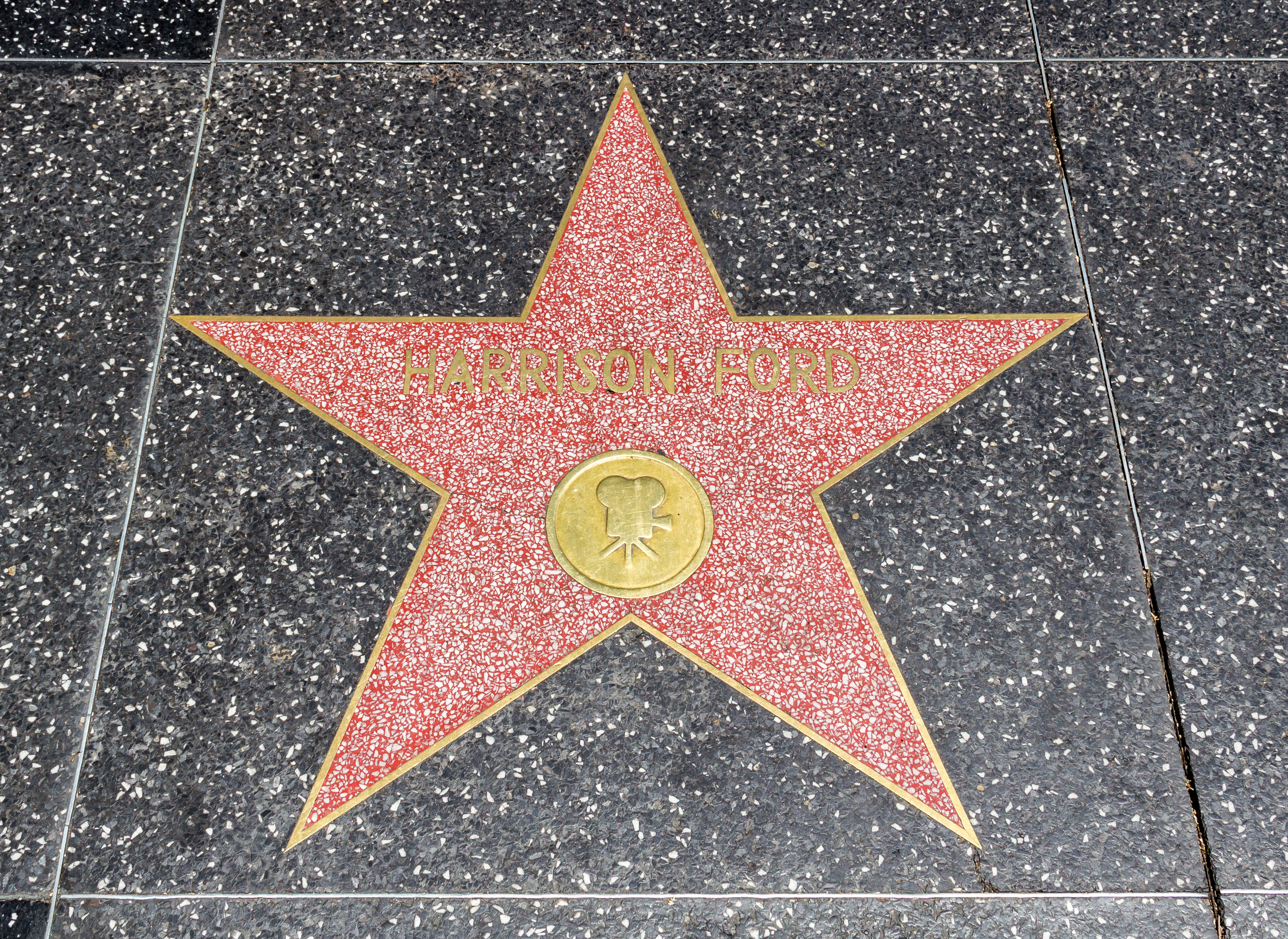
Ford's star on the Hollywood Walk of Fame

Other accolades received by Harrison Ford
Organization	Year	Honor	Ref.
Disney Legends	2024	Inductee	
Hasty Pudding Theatricals	1996	Man of the Year	
Hollywood Walk of Fame	2003	Inductee	
National Association of Theatre Owners	1994	Box Office Star of the Century	
SAG-AFTRA Foundation	2018	Artists Inspiration Award	

General aviation honors received by Harrison Ford
Organization	Year	Honor	Ref.
Experimental Aircraft Association	2008	Freedom of Flight Award	
Living Legends of Aviation	2008	Inductee	
National Aeronautic Association	2010	Wright Brothers Memorial Trophy	
National Business Aviation Association	2013	Al Ueltschi Award for Humanitarian Leadership	
