= Harrison Ford filmography =

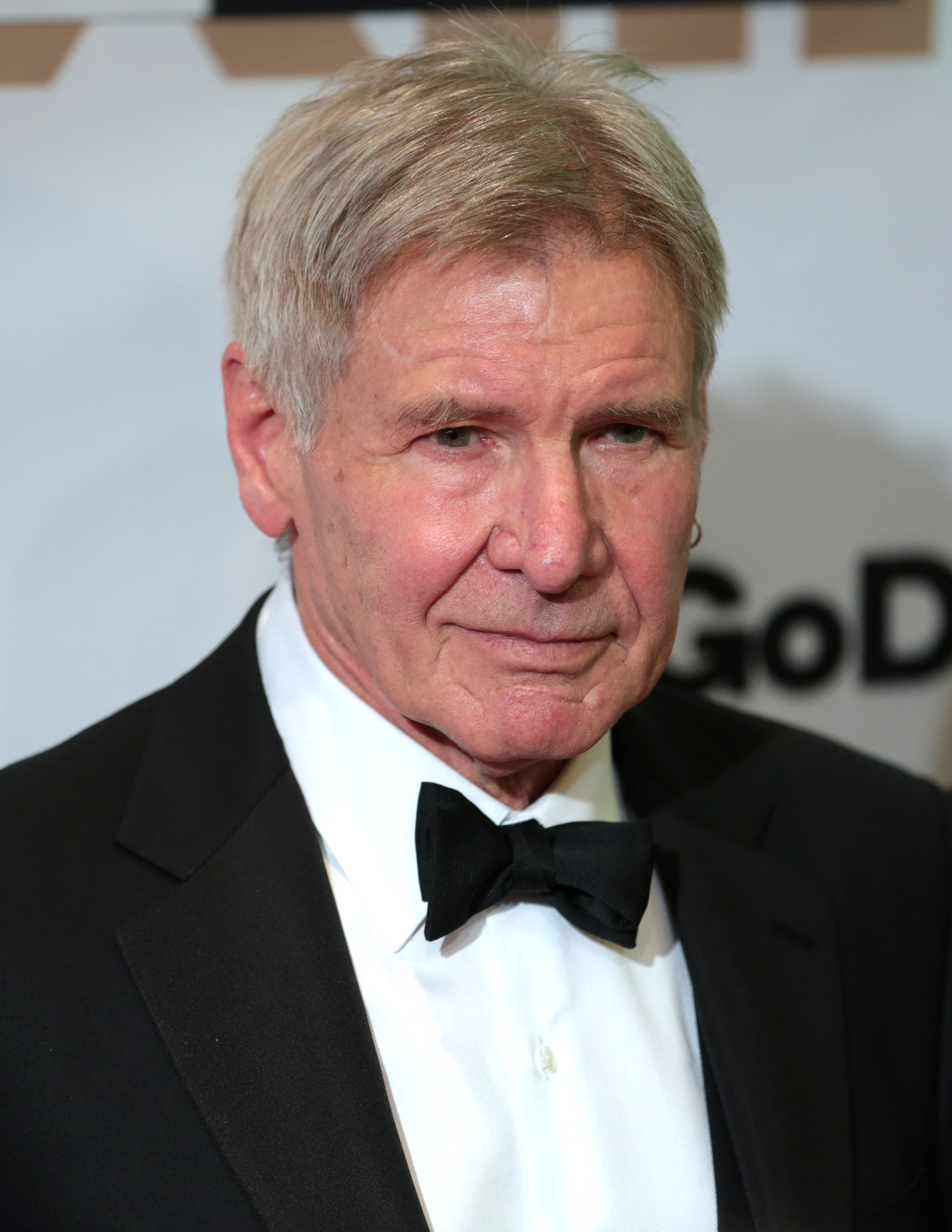
Ford in March 2017

Harrison Ford is an American actor who has had a career in the entertainment industry across seven different decades. Ford made his film debut in 1966 and spent most of the first ten years of his career in small supporting roles in both films and television before rising to stardom with his portrayal of Han Solo in the space opera films Star Wars (1977), The Empire Strikes Back (1980), Return of the Jedi (1983), and then again 32 years later in The Force Awakens (2015) and The Rise of Skywalker (2019). In the early 1980s, he starred as Indiana Jones in the adventure film Raiders of the Lost Ark (1981), a role he reprised in The Temple of Doom (1984), The Last Crusade (1989), The Kingdom of the Crystal Skull (2008) and The Dial of Destiny (2023). He has also portrayed two literary characters brought to film: the anti-hero detective Rick Deckard in the neo-noir science fiction film Blade Runner (1982) and its sequel 35 years later, Blade Runner 2049 (2017), and CIA analyst Jack Ryan in the action thrillers Patriot Games (1992) and Clear and Present Danger (1994). Ford also played a small role in the war film Apocalypse Now in 1979, as well as having a brief uncredited appearance as a circus construction worker in The Jerk that year. He had leading roles throughout the 1980s and 1990s with such films as the romantic dramatic thriller Witness with Kelly McGillis for which he received an Academy Award nomination for Best Actor, the romantic comedy-drama Working Girl with Melanie Griffith and Sigourney Weaver, the recovery drama Regarding Henry with Annette Bening, the man-on-the-run action-thriller The Fugitive with Tommy Lee Jones, and the romantic comedy-drama remake Sabrina with Julia Ormond, earning Golden Globe nominations for the latter two films.

In 1997, Ford starred as fictional U.S. President James Marshall opposite Gary Oldman in the political action-thriller Air Force One and then went on to play Russian submarine Captain Alexei Vostrikov opposite Liam Neeson in the Cold War-era thriller K-19: The Widowmaker in 2002, a film based on true events in which he also served as executive producer. He continued to diversify his choice of roles throughout the 2000s and 2010s, transitioning from leading man to character actor with such parts as cantankerous newsman Mike Pomeroy in the romantic comedy Morning Glory with Rachel McAdams and Diane Keaton, Colonel Woodrow Dolarhyde in the science fiction/western hybrid Cowboys & Aliens with Daniel Craig, real-life Brooklyn Dodgers general manager Branch Rickey in the historical sports drama 42 with Chadwick Boseman as Jackie Robinson, the no-nonsense Colonel Hyrum Graff in the science fiction adaptation of Orson Scott Card's novel Ender's Game with Ben Kingsley and Viola Davis, and the wounded aging lover William Jones in the romantic drama The Age of Adaline with Blake Lively and Ellen Burstyn. In 2019, Ford had his first voice performance in the animated film The Secret Life of Pets 2, and starred as John Thornton in an adaptation of Jack London's 1903 novel The Call of the Wild in 2020. In 2025, Ford replaced the late William Hurt as Thaddeus Ross in the film Captain America: Brave New World, set in the Marvel Cinematic Universe.

In addition to feature films and television, Ford has also narrated and participated in several documentaries.

== Film ==
Key
†	Denotes films that have not yet been released

Year	Title	Role	Notes	Ref.
1966	Dead Heat on a Merry-Go-Round	Bellhop Pager	Uncredited	
1967	A Time for Killing	Lt. Shaffer	Credited as Harrison J. Ford	
1967	Luv	Irate Motorist	Uncredited	
1968	Journey to Shiloh	Willie Bill Bearden		
1970	Zabriskie Point	Student	Uncredited	
1970	Getting Straight	Jake		
1973	American Graffiti	Bob Falfa		
1974	The Conversation	Martin Stett		
1977	Star Wars	Han Solo		
1977	Heroes	Ken Boyd		
1978	Force 10 from Navarone	Lt. Colonel Mike Barnsby		
1979	Hanover Street	David Halloran		
1979	Apocalypse Now	Colonel G. Lucas		
1979	The Frisco Kid	Tommy Lillard		
1979	More American Graffiti	Bob Falfa	Uncredited Cameo	
1980	The Empire Strikes Back	Han Solo		
1981	Raiders of the Lost Ark	Indiana Jones		
1982	E.T. the Extra-Terrestrial	Elliott's Principal	Deleted scene	
1982	Blade Runner	Rick Deckard		
1983	Return of the Jedi	Han Solo		
1984	Indiana Jones and the Temple of Doom	Indiana Jones		
1985	Witness	John Book		
1986	The Mosquito Coast	Allie Fox		
1988	Frantic	Dr. Richard Walker		
1988	Working Girl	Jack Trainer		
1989	Indiana Jones and the Last Crusade	Indiana Jones		
1990	Presumed Innocent	Rusty Sabich		
1991	Regarding Henry	Henry Turner		
1992	Patriot Games	Jack Ryan		
1993	The Fugitive	Dr. Richard Kimble		
1994	Jimmy Hollywood	Himself	Uncredited	
1994	Clear and Present Danger	Jack Ryan		
1995	One Hundred and One Nights	Himself		
1995	Sabrina	Linus Larabee		
1997	The Devil's Own	Tom O'Meara		
1997	Air Force One	President James Marshall		
1998	Six Days, Seven Nights	Quinn Harris		
1999	Random Hearts	Dutch Van Den Broeck		
2000	What Lies Beneath	Norman Spencer		
2002	K-19: The Widowmaker	Capt. Alexei Vostrikov	Also executive producer	
2003	Hollywood Homicide	Sgt. Joe Gavilan		
2006	Firewall	Jack Stanfield		
2008	Indiana Jones and the Kingdom of the Crystal Skull	Indiana Jones		
2009	Crossing Over	Max Brogan		
2009	Brüno	Himself	Cameo	
2010	Extraordinary Measures	Dr. Robert Stonehill	Also executive producer	
2010	Morning Glory	Mike Pomeroy		
2011	Cowboys & Aliens	Woodrow Dolarhyde		
2013	42	Branch Rickey		
2013	Paranoia	Jock Goddard		
2013	Ender's Game	Colonel Graff		
2013	Anchorman 2: The Legend Continues	Mack Tannen		
2014	The Expendables 3	Agent Max Drummer		
2015	The Age of Adaline	William Jones		
2015	Star Wars: The Force Awakens	Han Solo		
2017	Blade Runner 2049	Rick Deckard		
2019	The Secret Life of Pets 2	Rooster	Voice	
2019	Star Wars: The Rise of Skywalker	Han Solo	Uncredited cameo appearance	
2020	The Call of the Wild	John Thornton		
2023	Indiana Jones and the Dial of Destiny	Indiana Jones		
2025	Captain America: Brave New World	President Thaddeus Ross / Red Hulk		

== Documentary ==
Year	Title	Role	Notes	Ref.
1995	The World of Jacques Demy	Himself		
1996	The Immortal Beaver	Himself		
2001	Lost Worlds: Life in the Balance	Narrator		
2004	Empire of Dreams: The Story of the Star Wars Trilogy	Himself		
2004	Water to wine	Jethro the Bus Driver	Credited as "Jethro". Mockumentary video starring his son Malcolm	
2007	Dalai Lama Renaissance	Narrator		
2013	Drew: The Man Behind the Poster	Himself		
2013	Milius	Himself		
2014	Flying the Feathered Edge: The Bob Hoover Project	Himself		
2015	Living in the Age of Airplanes	Narrator		
2017	Toxic Puzzle - Hunt for the Hidden Killer	Narrator		
2017	Spielberg	Himself		
2017	Joan Didion: The Center Will Not Hold	Himself		
2019	Armstrong	Narrator (words of Neil Armstrong)		
2024	Saving Sakic	Himself		

== Television ==
Year	Title	Role	Notes	Ref.
1967	The Virginian	Young Rancher / Cullen Tindall	2 episodes	
1967	Ironside	Tom Stowe	Episode: "The Past Is Prologue"	
1969	My Friend Tony	Himself	Episode: "The Hazing"	
1969	The F.B.I.	Everett Giles / Glen Reverson	2 episodes	
1969	Love, American Style	Roger Crane	Episode: "Love and the Former Marriage"	
1970	The Intruders	Carl	Television film filmed in 1967	
1971	Dan August	Hewett	Episode: "The Manufactured Man"	
1972–1973	Gunsmoke	Hobey / Print	2 episodes	
1974	Kung Fu	Mr. Harrison	Episode: "Crossties"	
1974	Petrocelli	Tom Brannigan	Episode: "Edge of Evil"	
1975	Judgment: The Court Martial of Lieutenant William Calley	Frank Crowder	Television film	
1976	Dynasty	Mark Blackwood	Television film	
1977	The Possessed	Paul Winjam	Television film	
1978	The Star Wars Holiday Special	Han Solo	Television film	
1993	The Young Indiana Jones Chronicles	Indiana Jones	Episode: "Young Indiana Jones and the Mystery of the Blues"	
1997	Frontline	Narrator	Episode: "The Lost American"	
2014	Nature Is Speaking	The Ocean	Voice, Episode: "The Ocean"	
2022–2025	1923	Jacob Dutton	Main cast; 16 episodes	
2023–present	Shrinking	Dr. Paul Rhoades	Main cast; 27 episodes	

== Video games ==
Year	Title	Role	Ref.
2016	Lego Star Wars: The Force Awakens	Han Solo (voice)	
2024	Indiana Jones and the Great Circle	Indiana Jones (likeness, voiced by Troy Baker)	

== Music videos ==
Year	Title	Role	Ref.
2008	"Jimmy Kimmel & Ben Affleck: I'm F*cking Ben Affleck"	Himself	

== Theme park attractions ==
Year	Title	Role	Ref(s)
2027	Indiana Jones and the Myth of the Jade Serpent	Indiana Jones (likeness)	

== Audio CDs ==
Year	Title	Voice role	Ref.
1998	The Emperor's New Clothes: An All-Star Illustrated Retelling of the Classic Fairy Tale	The Weaver Thief Husband	

== See also ==
- List of awards and nominations received by Harrison Ford
