= 1st Blockbuster Entertainment Awards =

- Sponsored by: Blockbuster LLC
- Date: June 3, 1995
- Location: Pantages Theatre
- Country: USA
- Presented by: Blockbuster Entertainment
- Hosted by: Cindy Crawford; William Baldwin
- Reward: Trophy
- First award: 1995
- Final award: 2001

Highlights
- Most awards: Jim Carrey (3 times)
- Film: Winners hold in bold
- Music: Winners hold in bold
- Video Games: Not in Part

Television/radio coverage
- Network: CBS
- Viewership: 10 million
- Produced by: Ken Ehrlich
- Directed by: Bruce Gowers

The 1st Blockbuster Entertainment Awards were held on June 3, 1995, at the Pantages Theatre in Los Angeles. The awards originally had categories for both video and theatrical releases. Below is a complete list of winners.

== Film ==
=== Favorite Actress in an Action/Adventure/Thriller - Video ===
Sandra Bullock, Speed

=== Favorite Actress in an Action/Adventure/Thriller - Theatrical ===
Sandra Bullock, Speed

=== Favorite Actress in a Drama - Video ===
Meg Ryan, When a Man Loves a Woman

=== Favorite Actress in a Drama - Theatrical ===
Demi Moore, Disclosure

=== Favorite Actress in a Comedy - Video ===
Whoopi Goldberg, Sister Act 2

=== Favorite Actress in a Comedy - Theatrical ===
Jodie Foster, Maverick

=== Favorite Female Newcomer - Video ===
Angela Bassett, What's Love Got To Do With It

=== Favorite Female Newcomer - Theatrical ===
Cameron Diaz, The Mask

=== Favorite Actor in an Action/Adventure/Thriller - Video ===
Harrison Ford, The Fugitive

=== Favorite Actor in an Action/Adventure/Thriller - Theatrical ===
Harrison Ford, Clear and Present Danger

=== Favorite Actor in a Drama - Video ===
Tom Hanks, Philadelphia

=== Favorite Actor in a Drama - Theatrical ===
Tom Hanks, Forrest Gump

=== Favorite Actor in a Comedy - Video ===
Jim Carrey, Ace Ventura: Pet Detective

=== Favorite Actor in a Comedy - Theatrical ===
Jim Carrey, The Mask

=== Favorite Male Newcomer - Video ===
Jim Carrey, Ace Ventura: Pet Detective

=== Favorite Male Newcomer - Theatrical ===
Tim Allen, The Santa Clause

=== Favorite Movie - Video ===
Speed

=== Favorite Movie - Theatrical ===
Forrest Gump

=== Favorite Family Movie - Video ===
Rookie of the Year

=== Favorite Family Movie - Theatrical ===
The Lion King

=== Icon Award ===
Sylvester Stallone

=== Pioneer Award ===
Brian Grazer

== Music ==
=== Favorite Pop Artist - Female ===
Mariah Carey

=== Favorite Pop Artist - Male ===
Kenny G

=== Favorite Classic Rock Artist - Group ===
The Eagles

=== Favorite Classic Rock Artist - Male ===
Eric Clapton

=== Favorite R&B Artist - Female ===
Anita Baker

=== Favorite R&B Artist - Male ===
Luther Vandross

=== Favorite R&B Artist - Group ===
Boyz II Men

=== Favorite New Artist ===
Sheryl Crow

=== Favorite New Artist - Group ===
Ace of Base

=== Favorite Country Artist - Male ===
Alan Jackson

=== Favorite Country Artist - Female ===
Reba McEntire

=== Favorite Rap Artist - Duo or Group ===
Beastie Boys

=== Favorite Modern Rock Band ===
Green Day

=== Favorite CD ===
Boyz II Men-II

=== Favorite Soundtrack ===
The Lion King
