= Blockbuster Entertainment Awards =

Film awards ceremony (1995–2001)

- Awarded for: Home entertainment (music, film, and video games)
- Sponsored by: Blockbuster LLC
- Location: Los Angeles, Hollywood
- Country: United States
- Presented by: Blockbuster Entertainment
- Reward: Trophy
- First award: 1995; 31 years ago
- Final award: 2001; 25 years ago

Highlights
- Most awards: Nicolas Cage

Television/radio coverage
- Network: CBS (1995); UPN (1996–1998); Fox (1999–2001); Fox Radio
- Produced by: Ken Ehrlich

The Blockbuster Entertainment Awards was a film awards ceremony, founded by Blockbuster Entertainment, Inc., which was first presented in 1995, and lasted until 2001, with the decision to cancel the 2002 awards following concerns after the September 11 attacks. They were produced each year by Ken Ehrlich.

== Formation and first awards ==
The first annual awards were held on June 3, 1995, at the Pantages Theatre and broadcast on June 6. The idea for the awards show came from Blockbuster marketing executive Brian Woods, who worked on the project for two years. Blockbuster reportedly saw creating the awards as a way of promoting both the company and also the performers whose records and films were sold in their stores.

We wanted to have entertainers who are truly public favorites, like Arnold Schwarzenegger or Sylvester Stallone or Jean-Claude Van Damme, people who do big box office and big business in home video, but are not in the foreseeable future likely to be nominated for an Academy Award.

CBS signed a contract to broadcast the awards in late 1994, and Ken Ehrlich was hired to produce. Winners were determined by votes cast by customers in Blockbuster stores. The ballot consisted of the year's three top-grossing films, videos, and music albums in 33 categories. Over 1.5 million votes were cast and approximately 10 million people watched the awards on television. The ceremony was hosted by Cindy Crawford and William Baldwin. Celebrities who attended the ceremony included Bill Pullman, George Clooney, Kurt Russell, Steve Martin, Jennifer Tilly, Melanie Griffith, Danny Glover, Alfre Woodard, and David Spade. Jim Carrey, who won three awards, was one of the few winners who thanked voters for his award, stating: "I'm thankful for this award, even if you rented my tapes just to show the guy behind the counter that you rent more than porn videos." Eileen Fitzpatrick of Billboard magazine stated that the awards show was "surprisingly entertaining", and supported Blockbuster for "raising the status of home video". Fitzpatrick questioned the idea of presenting awards for films in both theatrical and video releases, saying it did not make much sense, as almost all films nominated had been on video for several months. This caused confusion for recipients, many of whom did not understand what award they were getting. Shortly after Sandra Bullock received the award for Best Action / Adventure / Thriller Actress in Video for the film Speed, she was named the winner for the same film in the theatrical category, and "literally didn't know whether she was coming on or going off the stage."

== Subsequent awards ==
The 2nd Blockbuster Entertainment Awards were held on March 6, 1996 at the Pantages Theatre, and hosted by Kelsey Grammer. As Blockbuster was owned by Viacom at the time, who also owned Paramount Pictures, MTV, Big Ticket Entertainment and Worldvision Enterprises, producer Ken Ehrlich stated the awards "bent over backward" to avoid any connections with Paramount, in order to give the awards more credibility. Paramount productions were nominated for only 5 of the 49 nominations, though coverage of the awards switched from CBS to the United Paramount Network. Unlike the first ceremony, which was broadcast as a pre-recorded special, the second ceremony was aired live. According to Billboard, over 3 million viewers watched the broadcast. Winners were chosen by votes cast between December 29, 1995 and January 16, 1996 by over 10 million Blockbuster patrons and Internet voters.

The 3rd Blockbuster Entertainment Awards were held on March 11, 1997, at the Pantages Theatre. Over 11 million votes were cast, which made it the largest publicly-voted awards presentation in history at the time. Reba McEntire, Tony Rich, Blackstreet and Garth Brooks performed live.

The 4th Annual Blockbuster Entertainment Awards were held on March 10, 1998, at the Pantages Theatre. Once again over 11 million votes were cast. Boyz II Men, Garth Brooks, Mariah Carey and Savage Garden performed live.

The 5th Blockbuster Entertainment Awards were held on June 16, 1999 at the Shrine Auditorium. It was the first ceremony to air on Fox, where approximately 6.5 million people watched the awards on television. Harry Connick Jr. described his nomination for Best Actor for the critically panned film Hope Floats as "absolutely insane".

The 6th Blockbuster Entertainment Awards were held on May 9, 2000 at the Shrine Auditorium, and for the first time presented awards for video games in addition to music and film. Christina Aguilera and the Backstreet Boys both received two awards.

The 7th and final Blockbuster Entertainment Awards were held on April 10, 2001, at the Shrine Auditorium. Approximately 4.5 million people watched the awards on television. Stevie Nicks, Sheryl Crow, Joe, Mystikal, LeAnn Rimes and Ricky Martin performed live at the event.

== Categories ==
These were the categories presented at the Blockbuster Entertainment Awards.

=== Movies ===
- Favorite Actor - Action/Adventure
- Favorite Actress - Action/Adventure
- Favorite Actor - Comedy
- Favorite Actress - Comedy
- Favorite Actor - Drama
- Favorite Actress - Drama
- Favorite Actor - Horror
- Favorite Actress - Horror
- Favorite Actor - Science Fiction
- Favorite Actress - Science Fiction
- Favorite Actor - Suspense
- Favorite Actress - Suspense
- Favorite Actor - Newcomer
- Favorite Actress - Newcomer
- Family Animated Favorite
- Family Favorite
- Family Favorite Film
- Favorite Family Film
- Favorite Supporting Actor - Action/Adventure
- Favorite Supporting Actress - Action/Adventure
- Favorite Supporting Actor - Comedy
- Favorite Supporting Actress - Comedy
- Favorite Supporting Actor - Drama
- Favorite Supporting Actress - Drama
- Favorite Supporting Actor - Horror
- Favorite Supporting Actress - Horror
- Favorite Supporting Actor - Science Fiction
- Favorite Supporting Actress - Science Fiction
- Favorite Supporting Actor - Suspense
- Favorite Supporting Actress - Suspense
- Favorite Actor - Drama/Romance
- Favorite Actress - Drama/Romance
- Favorite Actor - Comedy/Romance
- Favorite Actress - Comedy/Romance
- Favorite Supporting Actor - Drama/Romance
- Favorite Supporting Actress - Drama/Romance
- Favorite Supporting Actor - Comedy/Romance
- Favorite Supporting Actress - Comedy/Romance
- Favorite Comedy Team
- Favorite Action Team
- Favorite Actor - Action
- Favorite Actress - Action
- Favorite Actor - Action/Science Fiction
- Favorite Supporting Actor - Action/Science Fiction
- Favorite Villain
- Filmmaker Award
- World Artist Award

=== Music ===
- Favorite CD
- Favorite Duo/Group - Country
- Favorite Female - Country
- Favorite Male - Country
- Favorite Female - R&B
- Favorite Group - R&B
- Favorite Male - Rap
- Favorite Group - Rap
- Favorite Group - Classic Rock
- Favorite Group - Modern Rock
- Favorite Soundtrack
- Favorite Group - Pop
- Favorite Female - Pop
- Favorite Group - New Artist
- Favorite Male - New Artist
- Favorite Female - New Artist
- Favorite Male Artist - Pop
- Favorite Artist - Rap
- Favorite Latino Artist
- Favorite Latino Group
- Favorite Single
- Favorite Song from a Movie
- Favorite Artist - Comedy
- Favorite Female Artist of the Year
- Favorite Male Artist of the Year
- Favorite Group of the Year

=== Video Games ===
- Favorite Video Game
- Favorite PlayStation Game
- Favorite PlayStation 2 Game
- Favorite Nintendo 64 Game
- Favorite Game Boy Game
- Favorite Dreamcast Game

== Cancellation ==
In November 2001, after having run for seven consecutive years, Blockbuster announced they were canceling the awards following concerns after the September 11 attacks, stating: "Due to the uncertainty of the times, we can't predict consumer response to our show, nor audience behavior—especially media viewing habits—all of which are being affected by world events." Blockbuster stated their decision to cancel the awards was influenced by the fact that the 53rd Primetime Emmy Awards had to be rescheduled twice following security concerns after the September 11 attacks, and that when they did air, their ratings were 22% lower than the previous year.

== Ratings ==
Viewership and ratings per Blockbuster Entertainment Awards broadcast
Year	Day	Air date	Network	Household rating		18–49 rating		Viewers (millions)	Ref.
Year	Day	Air date	Network	Rating	Share	Rating	Share	Viewers (millions)	Ref.
1995	Tuesday	June 6	CBS	5.7	10	—N/a	—N/a	8.20	
1996	Wednesday	March 6	UPN	2.4	4	—N/a	—N/a	3.10	
1997	Tuesday	March 11	UPN	3.3	5	—N/a	—N/a	4.62	
1998	Tuesday	March 10	UPN	3.1	5	—N/a	—N/a	4.63	
1999	Wednesday	June 16	Fox	6.5	11	—N/a	—N/a	9.67	
2000	Tuesday	June 20	Fox	4.3	8	2.5	8	5.89	
2001	Wednesday	April 11	Fox	4.5	—N/a	2.7	8	6.44	
