= Harrison Ford =

American actor (born 1942)

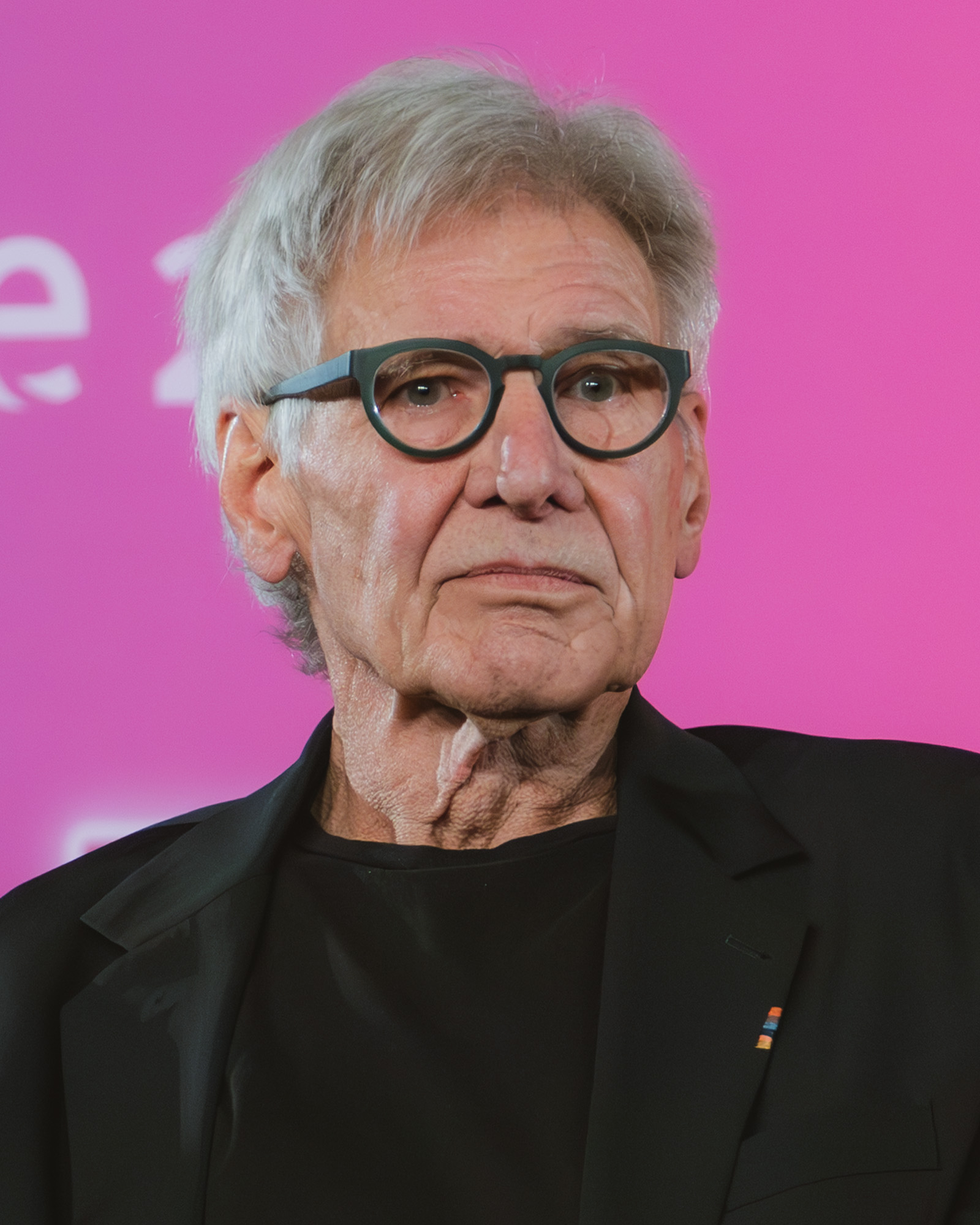
- Ford in 2025
- Born: July 13, 1942 (age 84); Chicago, Illinois, U.S.
- Occupation: Actor
- Years active: 1964–present
- Works: Full list
- Political party: Democratic
- Spouses: Mary Marquardt (m. 1964; div. 1979); Melissa Mathison (m. 1983; div. 2004); Calista Flockhart (m. 2010)
- Children: 5
- Awards: Full list

Vice Chair of Conservation International
- Current holder
- Assumed position 1991
- Preceded by: Position established

Harrison Ford (born July 13, 1942) is an American actor. Regarded as a cinematic cultural icon, Ford's accolades include nominations for an Academy Award, a British Academy Film Award, two Emmy Awards, five Golden Globes and two SAG-AFTRA's Actor Awards. He is also the recipient of the AFI Life Achievement Award, Cecil B. DeMille Award, Honorary César, Honorary Palme d'Or and SAG-AFTRA Life Achievement Award.

After making his screen debut in 1966 and early supporting roles in the films American Graffiti (1973) and The Conversation (1974), Ford achieved global stardom for portraying Han Solo in the space opera film Star Wars (1977), a role he reprised in four subsequent films for the eponymous franchise spanning the next four decades. He also received recognition for his portrayal of the titular character in the Indiana Jones franchise (1981–2023); Rick Deckard in the Blade Runner franchise (1982–2017); and Jack Ryan in the action thriller films Patriot Games (1992) and Clear and Present Danger (1994). These roles established him as an action hero and one of Hollywood's most bankable stars from the late 1970s into the early 2000s.

Ford's performance in the thriller film Witness (1985) earned him his sole Oscar nomination for Best Actor. His other films include The Mosquito Coast (1986); Working Girl (1988); Presumed Innocent (1990); The Fugitive (1993); Sabrina (1995); The Devil's Own (1997); Air Force One (1997); Six Days, Seven Nights (1998); What Lies Beneath (2000); K-19: The Widowmaker (2002); Cowboys & Aliens (2011); 42 (2013); The Age of Adaline (2015); The Call of the Wild (2020); and Captain America: Brave New World (2025). Ford has also starred in the Paramount+ western series 1923 (2022–2025) and the Apple TV+ comedy series Shrinking (since 2023), earning two nominations at the Primetime Emmy Awards for the latter.

Outside acting, Ford is a licensed pilot. He has often assisted the emergency services in rescue missions near his home in Wyoming and he chaired an aviation education program for youth from 2004 to 2009. Ford is also an environmental activist, having served as the inaugural vice chair of Conservation International since 1991. He is married to actress Calista Flockhart.

== Early life and education ==
Harrison Ford was born on July 13, 1942, at the Swedish Covenant Hospital in the Lincoln Square community area of Chicago, Illinois, to Dorothy (née Nidelman) and advertising executive and former vaudeville and radio actor John William "Christopher" Ford. His mother has been described as a radio actress, but Harrison Ford denies this, and the attribution may be due to confusion with the unrelated actress and model Dorothy Ford.

Ford's father was an Irish Catholic, his mother an Ashkenazi Jew whose parents were emigrants from Minsk. Ford described his upbringing as not so much about religious instruction, but more that he and his younger brother Terence were "raised Democrat", to be "liberals of every stripe." When asked on Inside the Actors Studio about the influence of his Irish Catholic and Russian Jewish ancestry, he quipped, "As a man I've always felt Irish, as an actor I've always felt Jewish." Ford was a Boy Scout, achieving the second-highest rank of Life Scout. When he was 16, he worked at Napowan Adventure Base Scout Camp as a counselor for the Reptile Study merit badge. He showed an affinity for snakes, collecting them for display and comparison. He also raised domesticated rats from a young age.

Ford graduated in 1960 from Maine East High School in Park Ridge, Illinois. His voice was the first student voice broadcast on his high school's new radio station, WMTH, and he was its first sportscaster during his senior year. During junior high and continuing to his early high school years, Ford faced problems with bullying. A group of his peers would corral him to a steep slope and force him down. After he climbed up, they would push him down again. In 1989, Ford described his memory of the experience:

The entire school would gather to watch this display. [. . .] I don't know why they did it. Maybe because I wouldn't fight the way they wanted me to. They wanted a fight they could win. And my way of winning was just to hang in there.

Ford attended Ripon College in Ripon, Wisconsin, where he was a philosophy major and a member of the Sigma Nu fraternity. A self-described "late bloomer", Ford took a drama class in the final quarter of his senior year to get over his shyness and became fascinated with acting. Ford was expelled from college for plagiarism four days before graduation.

== Career ==
Ford in 1964

=== 1964–1976: Early work ===
In 1964, after a season of summer stock with the Belfry Players in Wisconsin, Ford traveled to Los Angeles and eventually signed a contract with Columbia Pictures' new talent program. His first known role was an uncredited one as a bellhop in Dead Heat on a Merry-Go-Round (1966). There is little record of his non-speaking (or "extra") roles in film. Ford was at the bottom of the hiring list, having offended producer Jerry Tokofsky. According to one anecdote, Tokofsky told Ford that when actor Tony Curtis delivered a bag of groceries, he could tell that Curtis was a movie star whereas Ford was not; Ford immediately retorted that if Curtis was truly a talented actor, he would have delivered them like a bellhop. Ford was apparently fired soon after. In 1970 Ford met Patricia McQueeney, who would go on to work as his agent and manager.

Ford's speaking roles continued next with Luv (1967), though he was still uncredited. He was finally credited as "Harrison J. Ford" in the 1967 Western film A Time for Killing, starring Glenn Ford, George Hamilton and Inger Stevens, but the "J" did not stand for anything since he has no middle name. It was added to avoid confusion with a silent film actor named Harrison Ford, who appeared in more than 80 films between 1915 and 1932 and died in 1957. Ford later said that he was unaware of the existence of the earlier actor until he came upon a star with his own name on the Hollywood Walk of Fame. Ford soon dropped the "J" and worked for Universal Studios, playing minor roles in many television series throughout the late 1960s and early 1970s, including Gunsmoke, Ironside, The Virginian, The F.B.I., Love, American Style and Kung Fu. He appeared in the western Journey to Shiloh (1968) and had an uncredited, non-speaking role in Michelangelo Antonioni's 1970 film Zabriskie Point as an arrested student protester. In 1968, he also worked as a camera operator for one of the Doors' tours. French filmmaker Jacques Demy chose Ford for the lead role of his first American film, Model Shop (1969), but the head of Columbia Pictures thought Ford had "no future" in the film business and told Demy to hire a more experienced actor. The part eventually went to Gary Lockwood. Ford later commented that the experience had been nevertheless a positive one because Demy was the first to show such faith in him.

Not happy with the roles offered to him, Ford became a self-taught professional carpenter to support his then-wife and two young sons. Clients at this time included the writers Joan Didion and John Gregory Dunne, who lived on the beach at Malibu. Ford appears in the documentary Joan Didion: The Center Will Not Hold. He and his wife became friends of the writers. Casting director and fledgling producer Fred Roos championed the young Ford and secured him an audition with George Lucas for the role of Bob Falfa, which Ford went on to play in American Graffiti (1973). Ford's relationship with Lucas profoundly affected his career later. After director Francis Ford Coppola's film The Godfather (1972) was a success, he hired Ford to expand his office and gave him small roles in his next two films, The Conversation (1974) and Apocalypse Now (1979); in the latter film, Ford played an army colonel named "G. Lucas".

=== 1977–1997: Worldwide stardom and acclaim ===
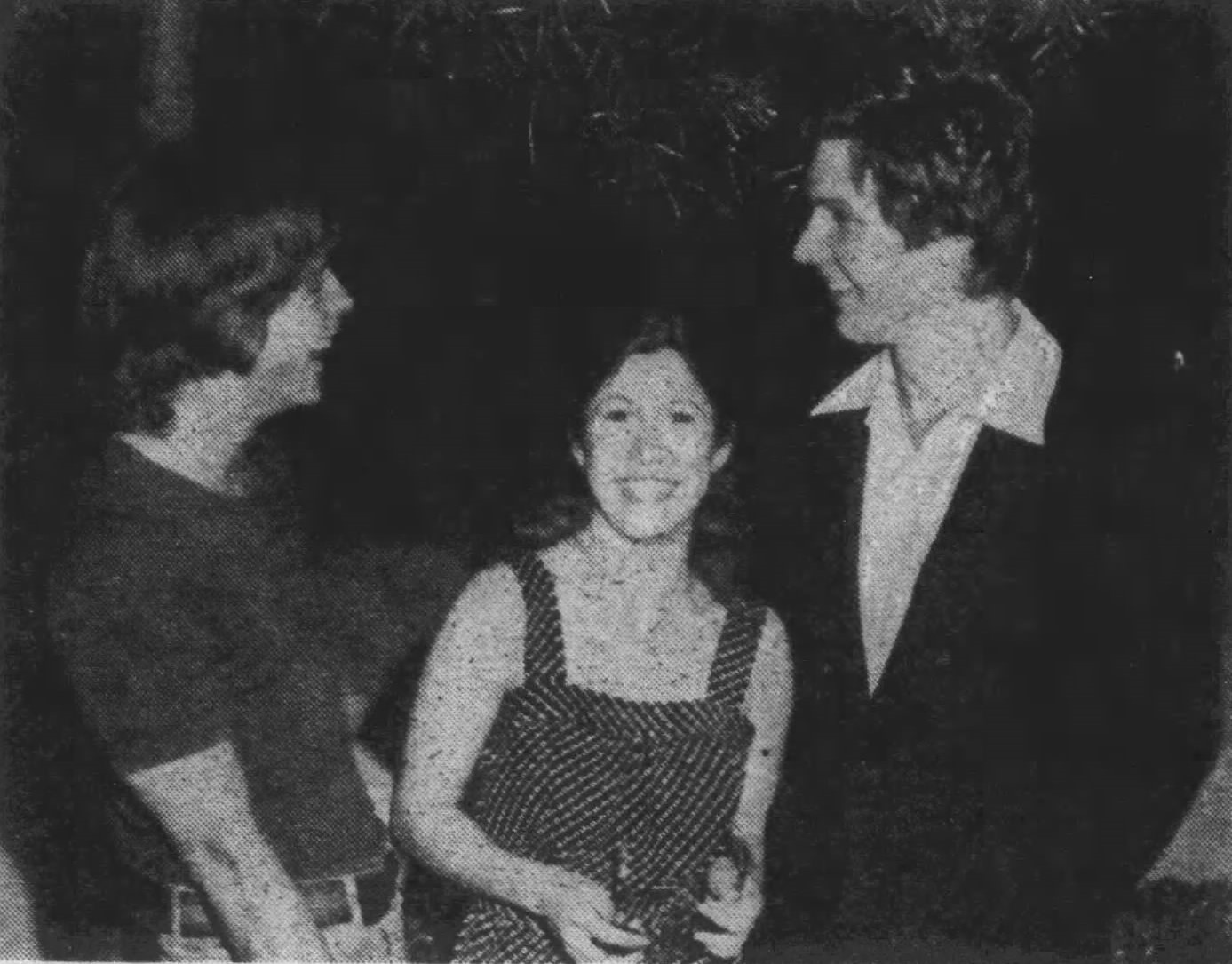
Ford (right) with Mark Hamill and Carrie Fisher in 1977

Ford's work in American Graffiti eventually landed him his first starring film role, when Lucas hired him to read lines for actors auditioning for roles in Lucas's upcoming epic space-opera film Star Wars (1977). Lucas was eventually won over by Ford's performance during these line reads and cast him as Han Solo. Star Wars became one of the most successful and groundbreaking films of all time and brought Ford and his co-stars Mark Hamill and Carrie Fisher widespread recognition. Ford began to be cast in bigger roles in films throughout the late 1970s, including Heroes (1977), Force 10 from Navarone (1978) and Hanover Street (1979). He also co-starred alongside Gene Wilder in the buddy-comedy western The Frisco Kid (1979), playing a bank robber with a heart of gold. Ford returned to star in the successful Star Wars sequels The Empire Strikes Back (1980) and Return of the Jedi (1983), as well as the Star Wars Holiday Special (1978). Ford wanted Lucas to kill off Han Solo at the end of Return of the Jedi, saying, "That would have given the whole film a bottom," but Lucas refused.

Ford's status as a leading actor was solidified with Raiders of the Lost Ark (1981), an action-adventure collaboration between Lucas and Steven Spielberg that gave Ford his second franchise role as the heroic, globe-trotting archaeologist Indiana Jones. Like Star Wars, the film was massively successful; it became the highest-grossing film of the year. Both Spielberg and Lucas were hesitant in casting Ford in the beginning according to Howard Kazanjian in his book A Producer's Life. Lucas's reasons were due to having already worked with him on both American Graffiti and Star Wars. Lucas relented after Tom Selleck was unable to accept, and Spielberg relented for that reason and after considering his performance in The Empire Strikes Back. Ford went on to reprise the role throughout the rest of the decade in the prequel Indiana Jones and the Temple of Doom (1984) and the sequel Indiana Jones and the Last Crusade (1989). During the June 1983 filming of Temple of Doom in London, Ford herniated a disc in his back. The 40-year-old actor was forced to fly back to Los Angeles for surgery and returned six weeks later.

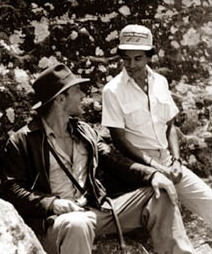
Ford with production manager Chandran Rutnam on the set of Indiana Jones and the Temple of Doom in Kandy, Sri Lanka, 1983

Following his leading-man success as Indiana Jones, Ford played Rick Deckard in Ridley Scott's dystopian science-fiction film Blade Runner (1982). Compared to his experiences on the Star Wars and Indiana Jones films, Ford had a difficult time with the production. He recalled to Vanity Fair, "It was a long slog. I didn't really find it that physically difficult—I thought it was mentally difficult." Ford and Scott also had differing views on the nature of his character, Deckard, that persist decades later. While not initially a success, Blade Runner became a cult classic and one of Ford's most highly regarded films. Ford proved his versatility throughout the 1980s with dramatic parts in films such as Witness (1985), The Mosquito Coast (1986) and Frantic (1988), as well as the romantic male lead opposite Melanie Griffith and Sigourney Weaver in the comedy-drama Working Girl (1988). Witness and The Mosquito Coast allowed Ford to explore his potential as a dramatic actor and both performances were widely acclaimed. Ford later recalled that working with director Peter Weir on Witness and The Mosquito Coast were two of the best experiences of his career.

In late 1991, Ford was scheduled to star in an action-historical film titled Night Ride Down, where he would have portrayed a Pullman Company executive whose daughter was kidnapped during a labor strike of the 1930s. Paramount Pictures shelved the project, after Ford quit the film over script changes he disagreed with. In the next few years, Ford became the second actor to portray Jack Ryan in two films of the film series based on the literary character created by Tom Clancy: Patriot Games (1992) and Clear and Present Danger (1994), both co-starring Anne Archer and James Earl Jones. Ford took over the role from Alec Baldwin, who had played Ryan in The Hunt for Red October (1990). This led to long-lasting resentment from Baldwin, who said that he had wanted to reprise the role but Ford had negotiated with Paramount behind his back. Ford played leading roles in other action-based thrillers throughout the decade, such as The Fugitive (1993), The Devil's Own (1997) and Air Force One (1997). For his performance in The Fugitive, which co-starred Tommy Lee Jones, Ford received some of the best reviews of his career, including from Roger Ebert, who concluded that, "Ford is once again the great modern movie everyman. As an actor, nothing he does seems merely for show and in the face of this melodramatic material he deliberately plays down, lays low, gets on with business instead of trying to exploit the drama in meaningless acting flourishes."

Ford played more straight dramatic roles in Presumed Innocent (1990) and Regarding Henry (1991) and another romantic lead role in Sabrina (1995), a remake of the classic 1954 film of the same name. Ford established working relationships with many well-regarded directors during this time, including Weir, Alan J. Pakula, Mike Nichols, Phillip Noyce and Sydney Pollack, collaborating twice with each of them. This was the most lucrative period of Ford's career. From 1977 to 1997, he appeared in 14 films that reached the top 15 in the yearly domestic box-office rankings, 12 of which reached the top ten. Six of the films he appeared in during this time were nominated for the Academy Award for Best Picture, among other awards: Star Wars, Apocalypse Now, Raiders of the Lost Ark, Witness, Working Girl and The Fugitive.

=== 1998–2014: Established career ===
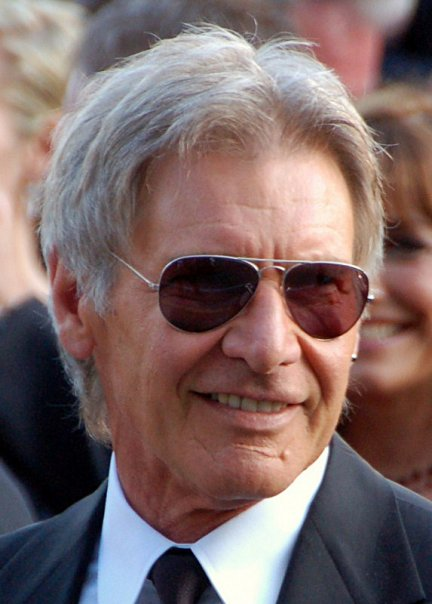
Ford at the 2008 Cannes Film Festival

In the late 1990s, Ford started appearing in several critically derided and commercially disappointing films that failed to match his earlier successes, including Six Days, Seven Nights (1998), Random Hearts (1999), K-19: The Widowmaker (2002), Hollywood Homicide (2003), Firewall (2006) and Extraordinary Measures (2010). One exception was What Lies Beneath (2000), which grossed over $155 million in the United States and $291 million worldwide. Ford served as an executive producer on K-19: The Widowmaker and Extraordinary Measures, both of which were based on true events. In 2004, Ford declined a chance to star in the thriller Syriana, later commenting that "I didn't feel strongly enough about the truth of the material and I think I made a mistake." The role went to George Clooney, who won an Oscar and a Golden Globe for his work. Before that, Ford had passed on a role in another Stephen Gaghan-written film, that of Robert Wakefield in Traffic, which went to Michael Douglas.

In 2008, Ford enjoyed success with the release of Indiana Jones and the Kingdom of the Crystal Skull, the first Indiana Jones film in 19 years and another collaboration with Lucas and Spielberg. The film received generally positive reviews and was the second-highest-grossing film worldwide in 2008. Ford later said he would like to star in another sequel "if it didn't take another 20 years to digest." Other 2008 work included Crossing Over, directed by Wayne Kramer. In the film, Ford plays an ICE/Homeland Security Investigations Special Agent, working alongside Ashley Judd and Ray Liotta. He also narrated a feature documentary film about the Dalai Lama, Dalai Lama Renaissance.

Ford filmed the medical drama Extraordinary Measures in 2009 in Portland, Oregon. Released on January 22, 2010, the film also starred Brendan Fraser and Alan Ruck. Also in 2010, he co-starred in the film Morning Glory, along with Rachel McAdams, Diane Keaton and Patrick Wilson. Although the film was a disappointment at the box office, Ford's performance was well received by critics, some of whom thought it was his best role in years. In July 2011, Ford starred alongside Daniel Craig and Olivia Wilde in the science-fiction/western hybrid film Cowboys & Aliens. To promote the film, he appeared at San Diego Comic-Con and, apparently surprised by the warm welcome, told the audience, "I just wanted to make a living as an actor. I didn't know about this." Also in 2011, Ford starred in Japanese commercials advertising the video game Uncharted 3: Drake's Deception for the PlayStation 3.

Ford reflects on his role as baseball owner Branch Rickey in the biopic 42 at the State Dining Room, April 2013.

2013 began a trend that saw Ford accepting more diverse supporting roles. That year, he co-starred in the corporate espionage thriller Paranoia with Liam Hemsworth and Gary Oldman, whom he had previously worked with in Air Force One, and also appeared in Ender's Game, 42 and Anchorman 2: The Legend Continues.

Ford's performance as Branch Rickey in the film 42 was praised by many critics and garnered Ford a nomination as best supporting actor for the Satellite Awards. Initially, Brian Helgeland was hesitant to cast Ford, seeking a character actor for the role of Rickey. However, Ford's persistence and dedication to the role, including studying Rickey's life and adopting significant physical transformations, won Helgeland over. Ford's commitment to embodying Rickey involved wearing a fat suit, prosthetics and mastering Rickey's distinctive voice and mannerisms. He researched Rickey's life, listened to recordings from the Baseball Hall of Fame and worked with a voice coach to capture Rickey's distinct speech. "I loved the language of the guy, I loved his style," Ford noted. In a 2023 interview with James Hibberd of The Hollywood Reporter, Ford said Branch Rickey is one of his roles he is most proud of.

In 2014, he appeared in The Expendables 3 and the following year, co-starred with Blake Lively in the romantic drama The Age of Adaline to positive reviews.

=== 2015–present: Return to franchise roles and Shrinking ===
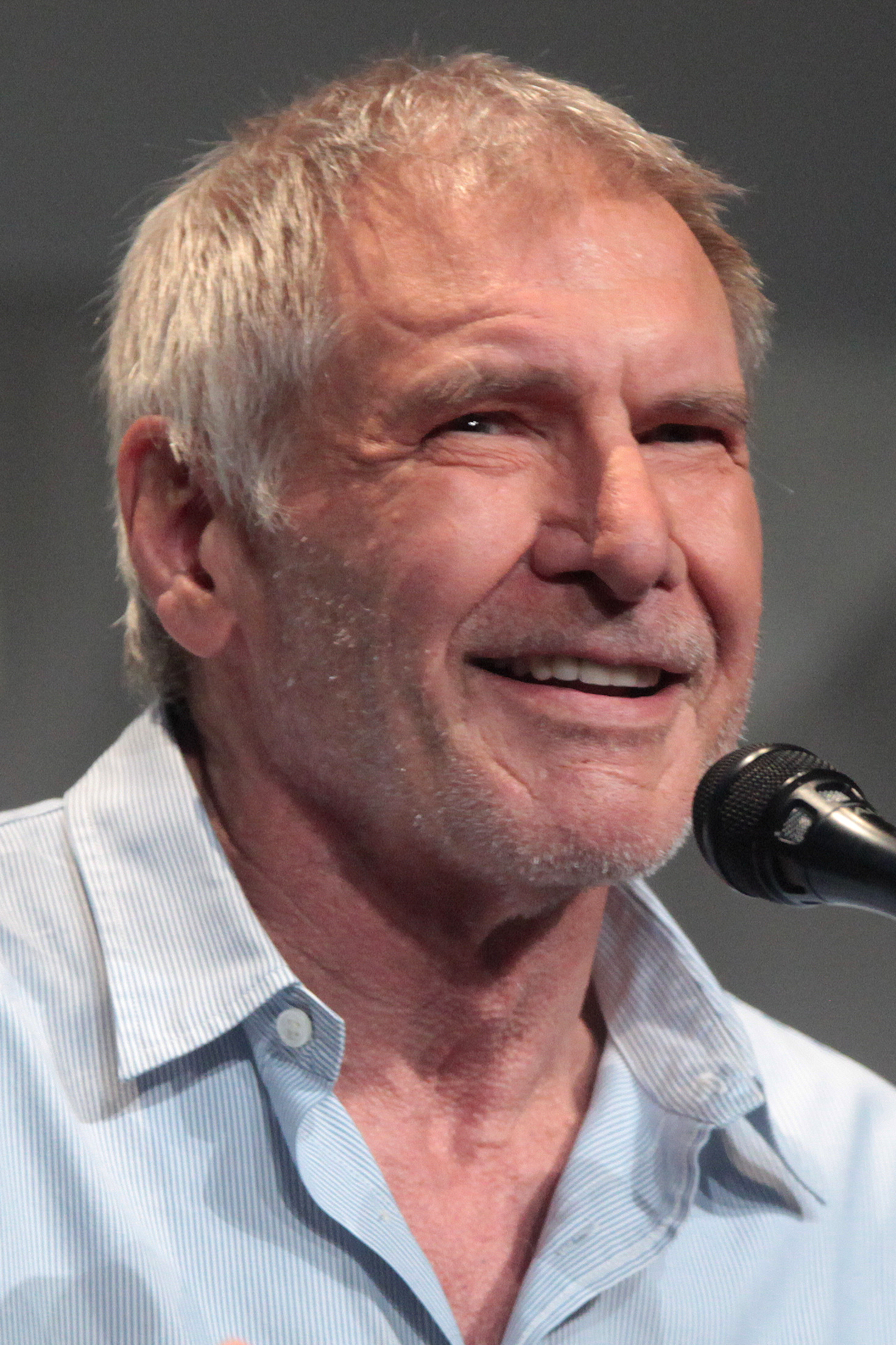
Ford at the 2015 San Diego Comic-Con

Ford reprised the role of Han Solo in the long-awaited Star Wars sequel Star Wars: The Force Awakens (2015), which was highly successful, like its predecessors. During filming on June 11, 2014, Ford suffered what was said to be a fractured ankle when a hydraulic door fell on him. He was airlifted to John Radcliffe Hospital in Oxford, England, for treatment. Ford's son Ben Ford released details on his father's injury, saying that his ankle would likely need a plate and screws and that filming could be altered slightly, with the crew needing to shoot Ford from the waist up for a short time until he recovered. Ford made his return to filming in mid-August, after a two-month layoff as he recovered from his injury. Ford's character was killed off in The Force Awakens, but it was subsequently announced, via a casting call, that Ford would return in some capacity as Solo in Episode VIII. In February 2016, when the cast for Episode VIII was confirmed, it was indicated that Ford would not reprise his role in the film after all. When Ford was asked whether Solo could come back in "some form", he replied, "Anything is possible in space." He eventually made an uncredited appearance as a vision in Star Wars: The Rise of Skywalker (2019).

On February 26, 2015, Alcon Entertainment announced Ford would reprise his role as Rick Deckard in Denis Villeneuve's science fiction sequel film Blade Runner 2049. Both the film and Ford's performance were well-received by critics upon its release in October 2017. Scott Collura of IGN called it a "deep, rich, smart film that's visually awesome and full of great sci-fi concepts" and Ford's role "a quiet, sort of gut-wrenching interpretation to Deckard and what he must've gone through in the past three decades." The film grossed $259.3 million worldwide, short of the estimated $400 million that it needed to break even. In 2019, Ford had his first voice role in an animated film, as a dog named Rooster in The Secret Life of Pets 2. With filming of a fifth Indiana Jones film delayed by a year, Ford headlined a big-budget adaptation of Jack London's The Call of the Wild, playing prospector John Thornton. The film was released in February 2020 to a mixed critical reception and its theatrical release was shortened due to the impact of the COVID-19 pandemic on the film industry.

In 2022, Ford was cast to star alongside Helen Mirren in the Paramount+ western drama series 1923. The two had previously starred together 36 years earlier in The Mosquito Coast. The series premiered in December 2022 to positive reviews and it is set to run for a total of two seasons. That same year, it was announced that Ford would star in the Apple TV+ comedy drama series Shrinking. The series premiered in January 2023 to positive reviews, with Ford receiving praise for his performance. In a 2023 interview with The Hollywood Reporter, it was revealed that he accepted the roles in both 1923 and Shrinking despite there not being a script at the time. For his work in Shrinking, Ford was nominated for several awards including a Golden Globe for Best Supporting Actor, a Critics' Choice Television Award for Best Supporting Actor in a Comedy Series, his first Screen Actors Guild Award for Outstanding Performance by a Male Actor in a Comedy Series and his first Emmy Award for Outstanding Supporting Actor in a Comedy Series.

Ford reprised the role of Indiana Jones in Indiana Jones and the Dial of Destiny (2023), which he later stated would be his last appearance as the character. The film received generally positive reviews, with many critics highlighting Ford's performance. In February 2025, Ford starred alongside Anthony Mackie (the new Captain America) as Thaddeus Ross in the Marvel Cinematic Universe film Captain America: Brave New World, replacing William Hurt after the latter's death. That same month, he brought attention to an ongoing strike by video game actors when he voiced support for Troy Baker playing the role of Indiana Jones in the video game Indiana Jones and the Great Circle, speaking out against the use of artificial intelligence.

== Personal life ==
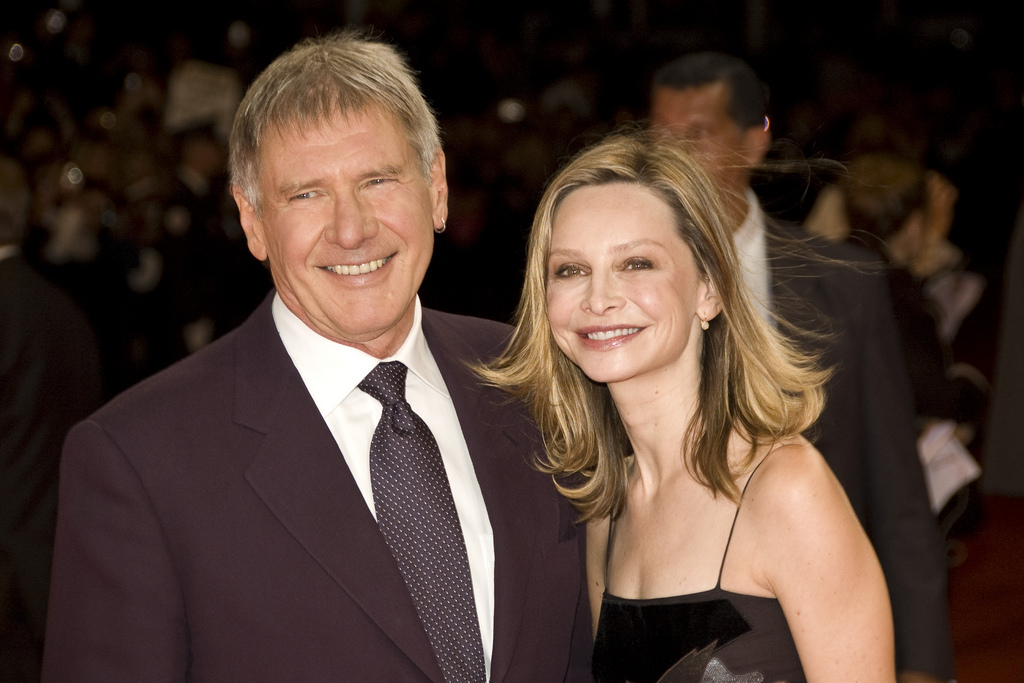
Ford and Calista Flockhart at the 2009 Deauville American Film Festival

Ford has been married three times, has four biological children and one adopted child. He was first married to Mary Marquardt from 1964 until their divorce in 1979. They had two sons, born in 1966 and 1969. The older son once co-owned Ford's Filling Station, a gastropub located at Terminal 5 in Los Angeles International Airport. The younger son is owner of the Ludwig Clothing company and previously owned Strong Sports Gym and the Kim Sing Theater.

Ford's second marriage was to screenwriter Melissa Mathison from March 1983 until their separation in 2000; they divorced in 2004. They had a son, born in 1987 and a daughter, born in 1990. Mathison died in 2015.

Ford began dating actress Calista Flockhart after they met at the 2002 Golden Globe Awards. He proposed to Flockhart over Valentine's Day weekend in 2009. They married on June 15, 2010, in Santa Fe, New Mexico, where Ford was filming Cowboys & Aliens. They are the parents of a son, born in 2001, whom Flockhart had adopted before meeting Ford. Ford and Flockhart live on an 800-acre (320-hectare; 3.2-square-kilometre) ranch in Jackson, Wyoming, where he has lived since the 1980s and approximately half of which he has donated as a nature reserve. They retain a house in the Brentwood neighborhood of Los Angeles. Ford is one of Hollywood's most private actors, guarding much of his personal life. Although Ford's fans have speculated that he has social anxiety disorder, he said in 2023 that he instead has "an abhorrence of boring situations".

In her 2016 autobiography The Princess Diarist, Carrie Fisher wrote that she and Ford had a three-month affair in 1976 during the filming of Star Wars.

Ford has expressed support for film director Roman Polanski, with whom he worked on the film Frantic. Polanski won an Oscar for directing The Pianist in 2003, but has avoided setting foot on US soil due to having fled the country in the 1970s after pleading guilty to a charge of unlawful sexual intercourse with a minor. Ford brought the Oscar statuette to Paris and presented it to Polanski. In 2009, Ford signed a petition calling for Polanski's release after his arrest in Switzerland for the 1977 charge.

In his early 20s, Ford got into a car crash on a blind curve in Laguna Canyon. The crash left a scar on his chin below his lips, which was later written into his films Working Girl and Indiana Jones and The Last Crusade.

== Aviation ==
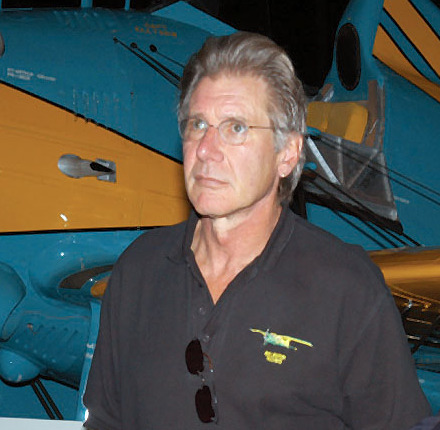
Ford touring the Air Force Museum in Dayton in 2003

Ford is a licensed pilot of both fixed-wing aircraft and helicopters. On several occasions, he has provided emergency helicopter services at the request of local authorities in Wyoming. In 2000, he airlifted an EMT to a 20-year-old hiker who was suffering from dehydration on Table Mountain. The following year, he was flagged down in his helicopter by a 13-year-old Boy Scout who got lost near Yellowstone National Park.

Ford began flight training in the 1960s at Wild Rose Idlewild Airport in Wild Rose, Wisconsin, flying in a Piper PA-22 Tri-Pacer, but at $15 an hour (equivalent to $160 in 2025), he could not afford to continue the training. In the mid-1990s, he bought a used Gulfstream II and asked one of his pilots, Terry Bender, to give him flying lessons. They started flying a Cessna 182 Skylane out of Jackson, Wyoming, later switching to Teterboro Airport in Teterboro, New Jersey, flying a Cessna 206 in which he made his first solo flight.

External videos
- Ford's Bell 407GX

Ford's aircraft are kept at Santa Monica Airport. His Bell 407 helicopter is often hangered at Jackson and has been used by Ford in two mountain rescues during his assigned duty time with Teton County Search and Rescue. During one of the rescues, Ford recovered a lost and disoriented hiker. She boarded his helicopter and promptly vomited into one of the rescuers' caps, unaware of who the pilot was until much later; "I can't believe I barfed in Harrison Ford's helicopter!" she said later.

Ford flies his de Havilland Canada DHC-2 Beaver (registration N28S) more than any of his other aircraft and has repeatedly said that he likes this aircraft and the sound of its Pratt & Whitney R-985 radial engine. According to Ford, it had been flown in the CIA's Air America operations and was riddled with bullet holes that had to be patched up.

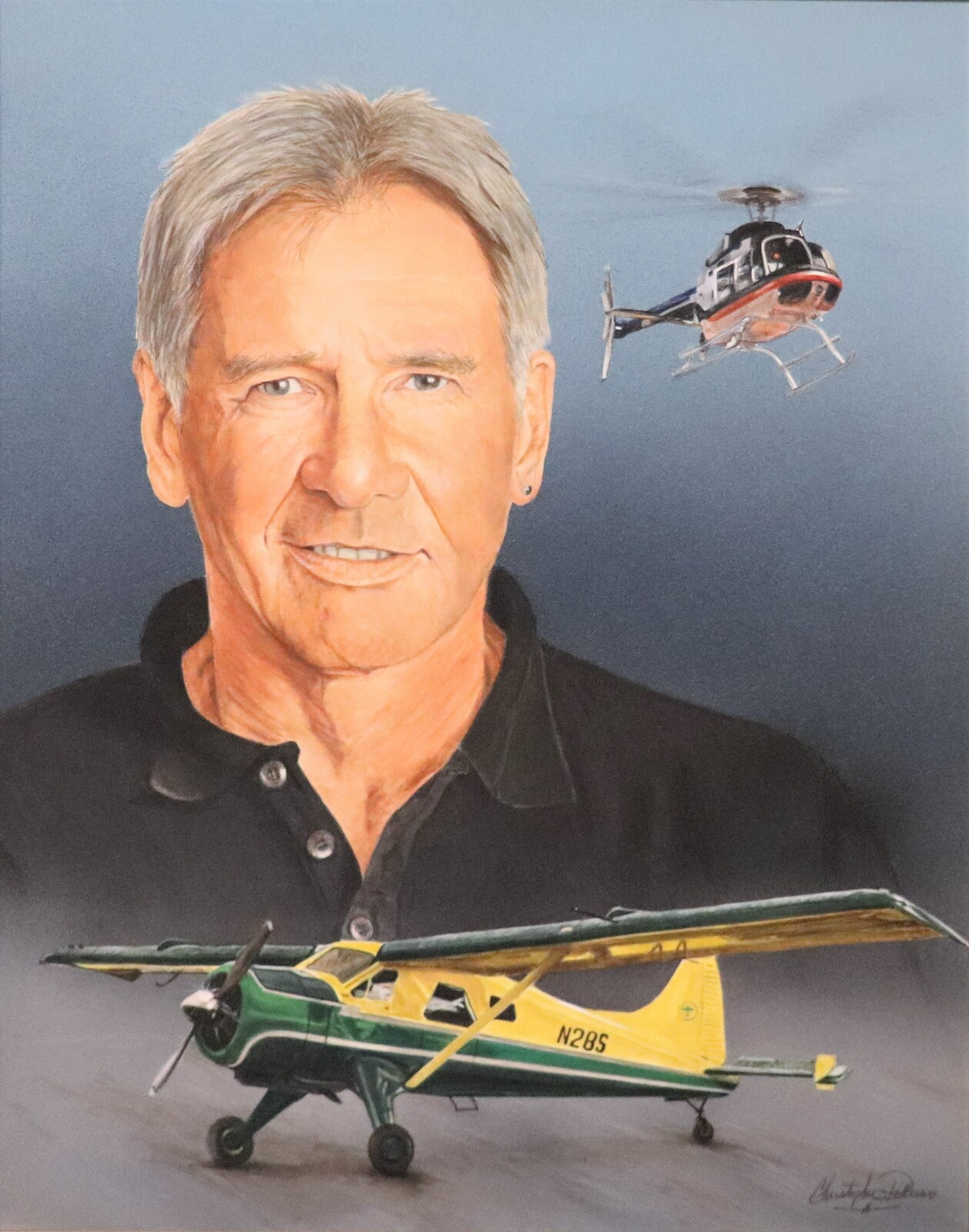
Ford's 2010 International Air & Space Hall of Fame portrait in the Air & Space Museum in San Diego

In March 2004, Ford became chairman of the Experimental Aircraft Association (EAA)'s Young Eagles program, founded by then-EAA president Tom Poberezny and fellow actor-pilot Cliff Robertson. Ford was asked to take the position by Greg Anderson, Senior Vice President of the EAA at the time, to replace General Chuck Yeager, who was vacating the post that he had held for many years. Ford at first was hesitant, but later accepted the offer and has made appearances with the Young Eagles at the EAA AirVenture Oshkosh gathering at Oshkosh, Wisconsin, for two years. In July 2005, at the gathering in Oshkosh, Ford agreed to accept the position for another two years. He has flown over 280 children as part of the Young Eagles program, usually in his DHC-2 Beaver, which can seat the actor and five children. Ford stepped down as program chairman in 2009 and was replaced by Captain Chesley Sullenberger and First Officer Jeff Skiles. He is involved with the EAA chapter in Driggs, Idaho, just over the Teton Range from Jackson, Wyoming. On July 28, 2016, Ford flew the two millionth Young Eagle at the EAA AirVenture convention, making it the most successful youth aviation introduction program in history.

As of 2009, Ford appears in Internet advertisements for General Aviation Serves America, a campaign by the advocacy group Aircraft Owners and Pilots Association (AOPA). He has also appeared in several independent aviation documentaries, including Wings Over the Rockies (2009), Flying the Feathered Edge: The Bob Hoover Project (2014) and Living in the Age of Airplanes (2015).

Ford is an honorary board member of the humanitarian aviation organization Wings of Hope, and has made several trips to Washington, D.C., to fight for pilots' rights. He has also donated substantial funds to aerobatic champion Sean Tucker's charitable program, The Bob Hoover Academy (named after legendary aviator Bob Hoover), which educates at-risk teens in central California and teaches them how to fly.

=== Incidents ===
On August 22, 1987, Ford was traveling as a passenger with Clint Eastwood and Sondra Locke aboard a Gulfstream III when the jet developed an engine fire and stuck landing gear during a Paris-to-L.A. flight and was forced to land in Bangor, Maine. The charter company owning the G-3 sent another jet and mechanics to Bangor and the group flew out on that plane the next day.

On October 23, 1999, Ford was involved in the crash of a Bell 206L4 LongRanger helicopter. The NTSB accident report states that Ford was piloting the aircraft over the Lake Piru riverbed near Santa Clarita, California, on a routine training flight. While making his second attempt at an autorotation with powered recovery, the aircraft was unable to recover power after the sudden drop in altitude. It landed hard and skidded forward in the loose gravel before flipping onto its side. Neither Ford nor the instructor pilot suffered any injuries, though the helicopter was seriously damaged.

On March 5, 2015, Ford's plane, believed to be a Ryan PT-22 Recruit, made an emergency landing on the Penmar Golf Course in Venice, California, after it lost engine power. He was taken to Ronald Reagan UCLA Medical Center, where he was reported to be in fair to moderate condition. Ford suffered a broken pelvis and broken ankle during the accident, as well as other injuries.

On February 13, 2017, Ford landed an Aviat Husky at John Wayne Airport in Orange County, California, on the taxiway left of runway 20L. A Boeing 737 was holding short of the runway on the taxiway when Ford overflew them.

On April 24, 2020, at the Los Angeles Hawthorne Airport while piloting his Husky, Ford crossed a runway where another aircraft was landing. According to the FAA, the two planes were about 3,600 feet from each other and there was no danger of collision. A representative of Ford later said that he "misheard" an instruction given to him by air traffic control.

== Activism ==
=== Environmental work ===
Ford is vice-chair of Conservation International, an American nonprofit environmental organization headquartered in Arlington, Virginia. The organization's intent is to protect nature. Since 1992, Ford has lent his voice to a series of public service messages promoting environmental involvement for EarthShare, an American federation of environmental and conservation charities. He has acted as a spokesperson for Restore Hetch Hetchy, a non-profit organization dedicated to restoring Yosemite National Park's Hetch Hetchy Valley to its original condition. Ford also appears in the documentary series Years of Living Dangerously, which reports on people affected by and seeking solutions to climate change.

In 1993, the arachnologist Norman Platnick named a new species of spider Calponia harrisonfordi and in 2002 the entomologist Edward O. Wilson named a new ant species Pheidole harrisonfordi (in recognition of Harrison's work as Vice Chairman of Conservation International). The Peruvian snake species Tachymenoides harrisonfordi was named for Ford in 2023.

In September 2013, Ford, while filming an environmental documentary in Indonesia, interviewed the Indonesian Forestry Minister, Zulkifli Hasan. After the interview, Ford and his crew were accused of "harassing state institutions" and publicly threatened with deportation. Questions within the interview concerned the Tesso Nilo National Park, Sumatra. It was alleged the Minister of Forestry was given no prior warning of questions nor the chance to explain the challenges of catching illegal loggers. Ford was provided an audience with the Indonesian President, Susilo Bambang Yudhoyono, during which he expressed concerns regarding Indonesia's environmental degradation and the government efforts to address climate change. In response, the President explained Indonesia's commitment to preserving its oceans and forests.

In 2019, on behalf of Conservation International, Ford gave an impassioned speech during the United Nations' Climate Action Summit in New York on the destruction of the Amazon rainforest and its effect on climate change for the rest of the world. Ford urged his audience to listen to 'angry young people' trying to make a difference in the situation, emphasizing, "The most important thing we can do for them is to get the hell out of their way."

In 2025, the E.O. Wilson Biodiversity Foundation gave Ford its inaugural E.O. Wilson Legacy Award for Transformative Conservation Leadership.

=== Political views ===
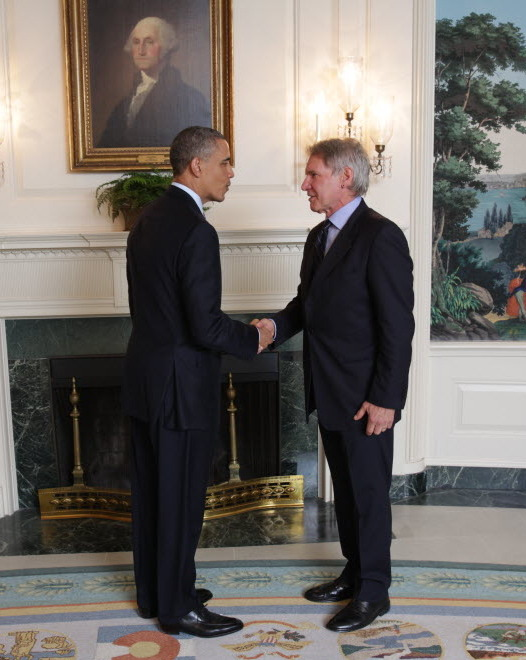
President Barack Obama greets Ford in the Diplomatic Reception Room, April 2, 2013.

Like his parents, Ford is a lifelong Democrat. On September 7, 1995, Ford testified before the U.S. Senate Foreign Relations Committee in support of the Dalai Lama and an independent Tibet. In 2007, he narrated the documentary Dalai Lama Renaissance. In 2000, Ford donated $1,000 to the presidential campaigns of Bill Bradley, Al Gore and John McCain. In 2003, he publicly condemned the Iraq War and called for "regime change" in the United States. He also criticized Hollywood for making movies which were "more akin to video games than stories about human life and relationships" and he called for more gun control in the United States.

After Republican presidential candidate Donald Trump said his favorite role of Ford's was Air Force One because he "stood up for America", Ford responded that it was just a film and made critical statements against Trump's presidential bid. Ford endorsed Joe Biden's 2020 presidential campaign against Trump. He said that he wanted to "encourage people to support candidates that will support the environment" and felt that under Trump, the U.S. had "lost some of our credibility in the world". Along with Mark Hamill, Ford worked with the anti-Trump Republican group The Lincoln Project to produce and narrate a 2020 election ad attacking Trump's disparaging of Anthony Fauci. On November 2, 2024, he endorsed Kamala Harris's 2024 presidential campaign.

=== Archaeology ===
Following on his success portraying the archaeologist Indiana Jones, Ford also plays a part in supporting the work of professional archaeologists. He serves as a General Trustee on the Governing Board of the Archaeological Institute of America (AIA), his appointment helped to raise public awareness of the AIA and its mission. The AIA is North America's oldest and largest organization devoted to the world of archaeology. It promotes archaeological excavation, research, education, and preservation on a global basis.

== Acting credits and accolades ==
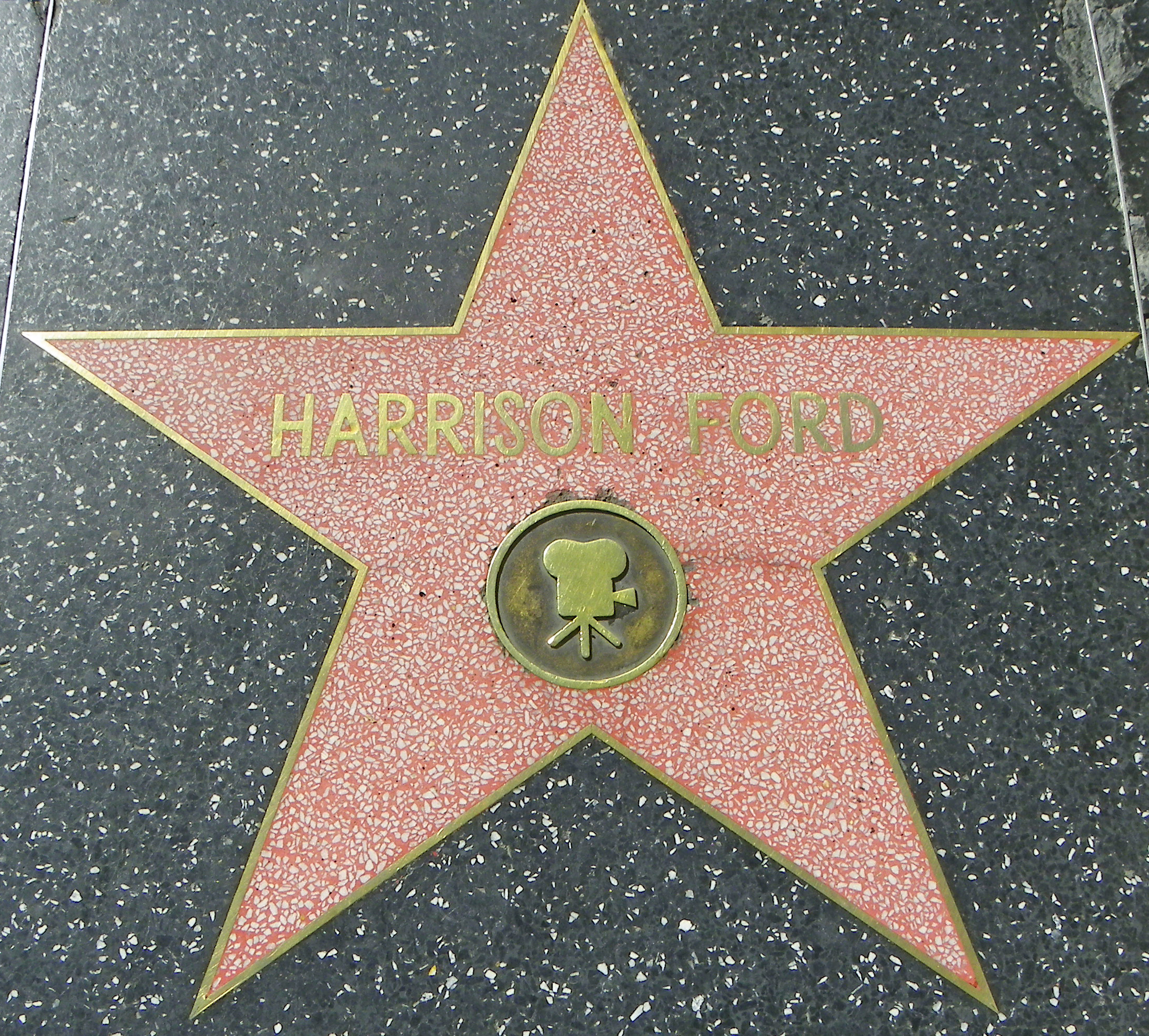
Ford's star on the Hollywood Walk of Fame

Throughout his career, Ford has received significant recognition for his work in the entertainment industry. In 1986, he was nominated for Best Actor at the 58th Academy Awards for his performance in Witness, a role for which he also received BAFTA and Golden Globe nominations in the same category. Three additional Golden Globe nominations went to Ford in 1987, 1994 and 1996 for his performances in The Mosquito Coast, The Fugitive and Sabrina. In 2000, he was the recipient of the AFI Life Achievement Award from the American Film Institute for his body of work, presented to him by two of his closest collaborators and fellow industry giants, George Lucas and Steven Spielberg. In 2002, he was given the Cecil B. DeMille Award, another career achievement honor, from the Hollywood Foreign Press Association at the 59th Golden Globe Awards ceremony. On May 30, 2003, Ford received a star on the Hollywood Walk of Fame.

In 2006, he received the Jules Verne Award, given to an actor who has "encouraged the spirit of adventure and imagination" throughout their career. He was presented with the first-ever Hero Award at the 2007 Scream Awards for his many iconic roles, including Indiana Jones and Han Solo (both of which earned him a collective three Saturn Awards for Best Actor in 1982, 2024 and 2016, respectively) and in 2008 he received the Spike TV's Guy's Choice Award for "Brass Balls". In 2015, Ford received the Albert R. Broccoli Britannia Award for Worldwide Contribution to Entertainment from BAFTA Los Angeles. In 2018, Ford was honored by the SAG-AFTRA Foundation with the Artists Inspiration Award for both his acting and philanthropic work alongside fellow honoree Lady Gaga. SAG-AFTRA Foundation Board President JoBeth Williams in the press release said, "Harrison Ford is an acting legend in every known galaxy, but what many do not know are the decades of philanthropic service and leadership he has given to Conservation International to help protect our planet."

Other prestigious film honors for Ford include an Honorary Cesar, an Honorary Palme d'Or from the Cannes Film Festival, the Career Achievement Award from the Hollywood Film Awards, the Kirk Douglas Award for Excellence in Film from the Santa Barbara International Film Festival, the Box Office Star of the Century Award from the National Association of Theatre Owners and the Lifetime Achievement Award from both the Locarno Film Festival and the Zurich Film Festival.

Ford has also been honored multiple times for his involvement in general aviation, receiving the Living Legends of Aviation Award and the Experimental Aircraft Association's Freedom of Flight Award in 2009, the Wright Brothers Memorial Trophy in 2010, and the Al Ueltschi Humanitarian Award in 2013. Flying magazine ranked him number 48 on their 2013 list of the 51 Heroes of Aviation.

In March 2026, Ford received the SAG-AFTRA Life Achievement Award for his career achievements and humanitarian accomplishments. In his acceptance speech, Ford said he was not an "overnight success", moving between acting and carpentry jobs for 15 years. He thanked George Lucas and Steven Spielberg for his early roles in American Graffiti and Star Wars.

== See also ==
- List of actors who have appeared in multiple Palme d'Or winners
