= Honorary Palme d'Or =

Highest prize awarded at the Cannes Film Festival

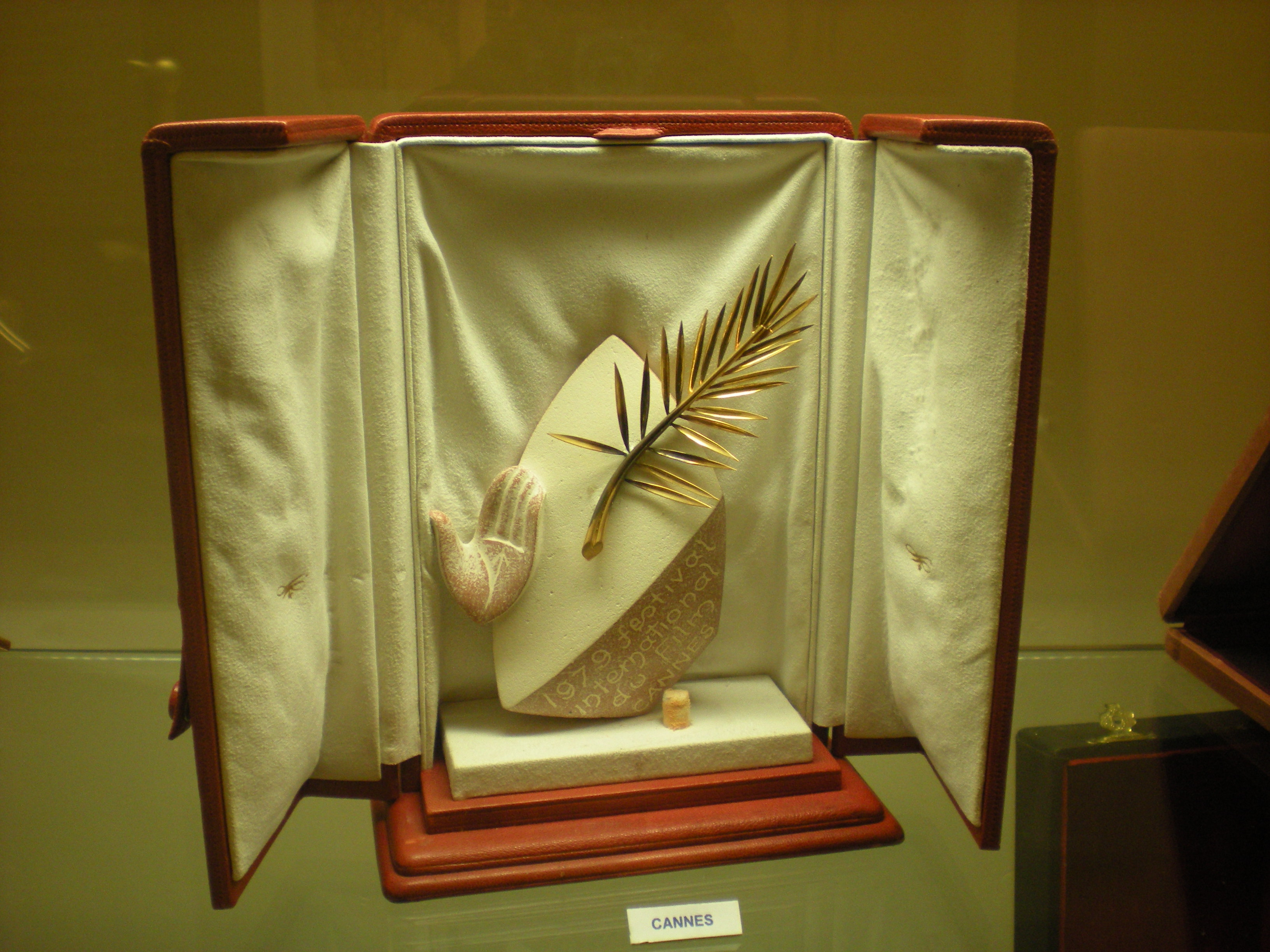
- Location: Cannes
- Country: France
- Presented by: Cannes Film Festival
- Currently held by: Peter Jackson; John Travolta; Barbra Streisand
- Website: Official website

The Honorary Palme d'Or (French: Palme d'honneur) is an award given at the Cannes Film Festival. It is awarded to directors, actors and other personalities from the world of cinema who have distinguished themselves in the art. It joins the Palme d'Or as the festival's highest prize.

== History ==
The prize was introduced at the 1997 edition by the festival's organizing committee on the occasion of the 50th anniversary of the Festival as the "Palme des Palmes", being also an homage to Swedish filmmaker Ingmar Bergman who had never been awarded a competitive Palme.

Only in 2002, the festival began to award it regularly to individuals who have achieved a notable body of work in the global cinema industry, but who had never won a competitive Palme d'Or. In 2024, Studio Ghibli became the first and only studio to win it.

Some past main competition jury presidents have won the prize, including: Jeanne Moreau, Clint Eastwood, Bernardo Bertolucci and Robert De Niro.

As of 2026, Studio Ghibli is the only non-Western winner of the prize. Most of the winners are Europeans or Americans filmmakers, actors or producers. Ghibli was also the first production company to receive the award, at the 2024 edition.

== Recipients ==
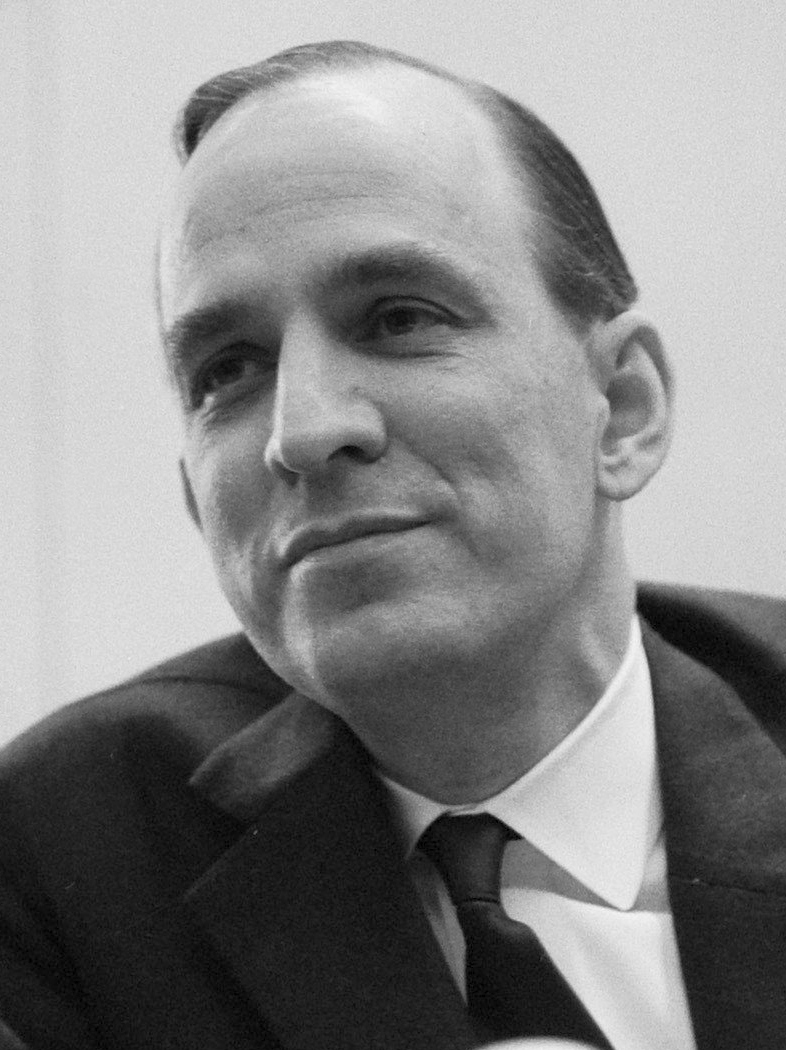
Ingmar Bergman won in 1997.

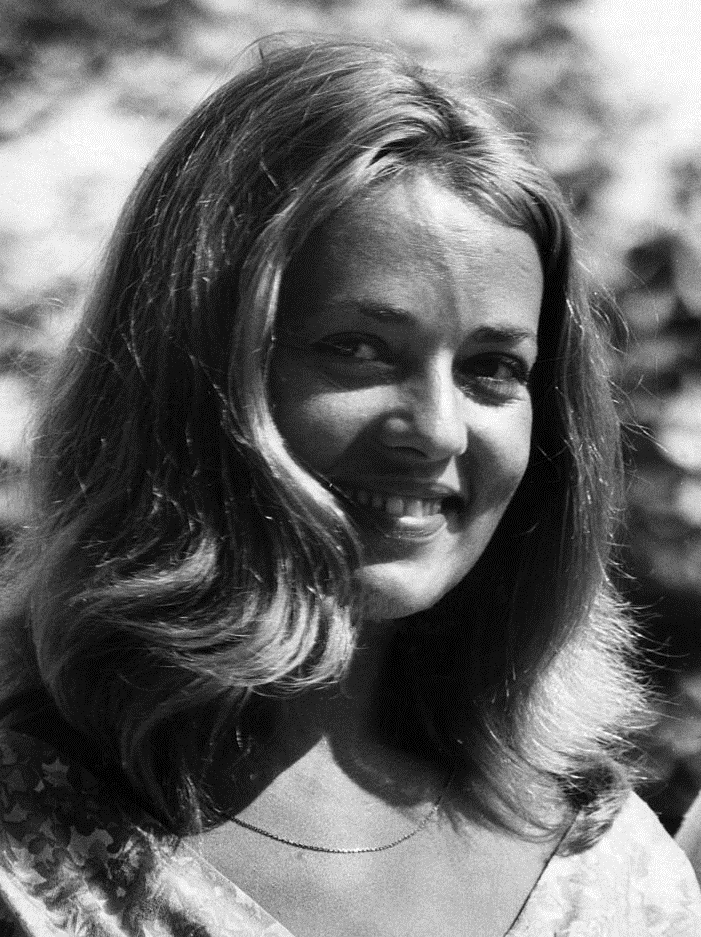
Jeanne Moreau won in 2003.

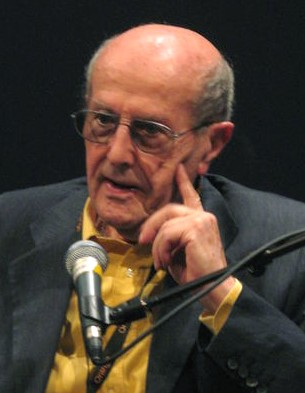
Manoel de Oliveira won in 2008.

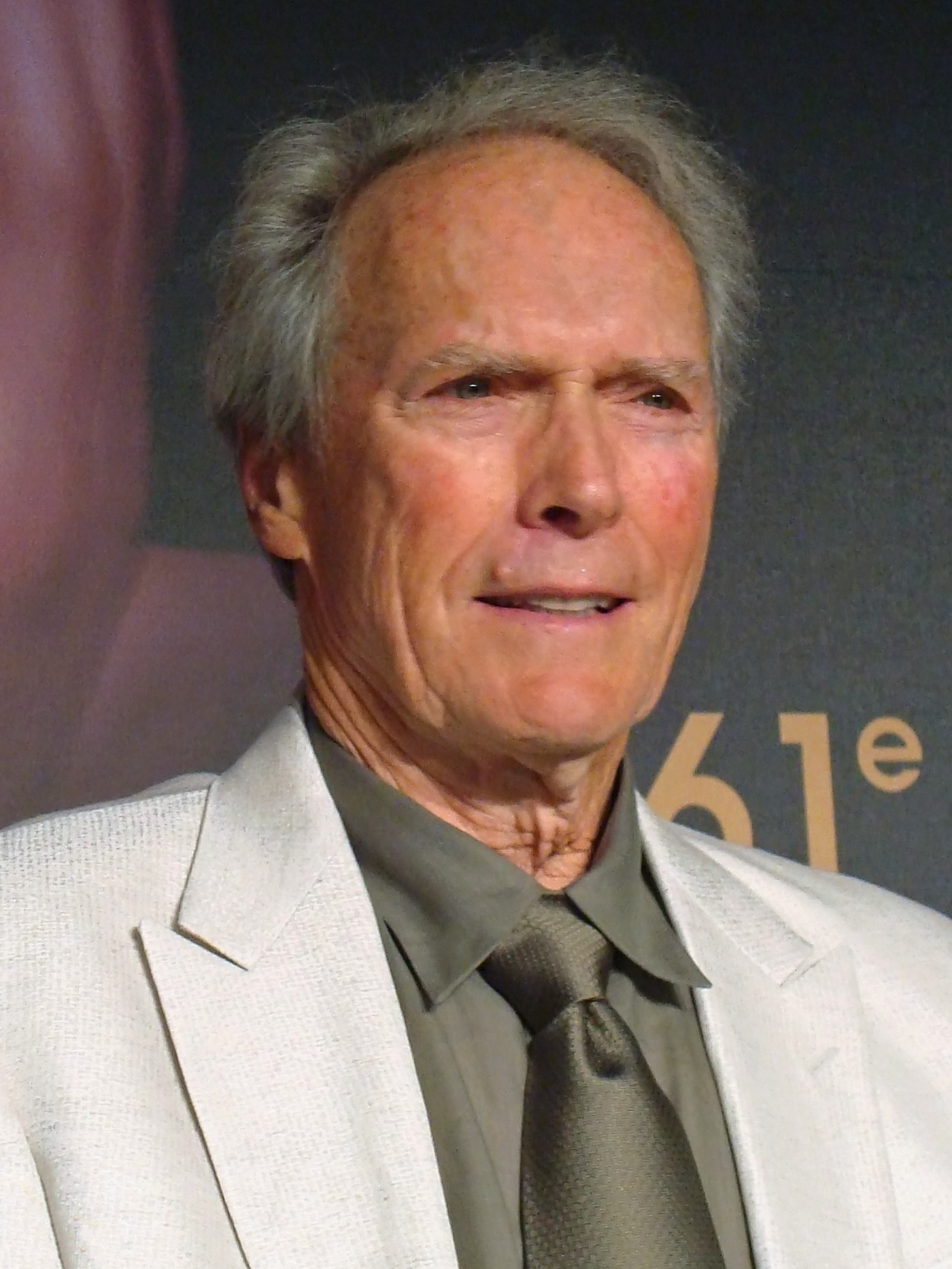
Clint Eastwood won in 2009.

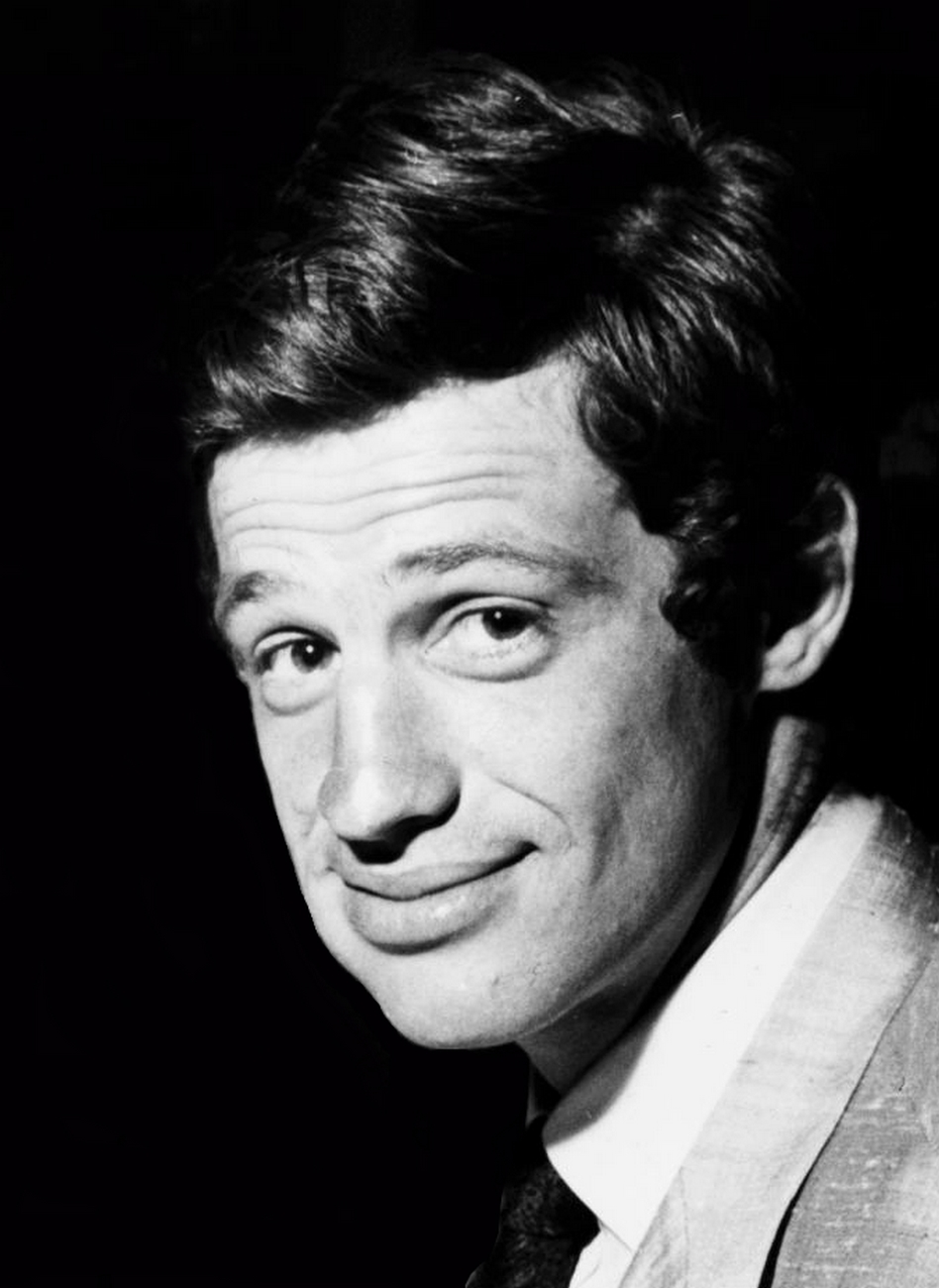
Jean-Paul Belmondo won in 2011.

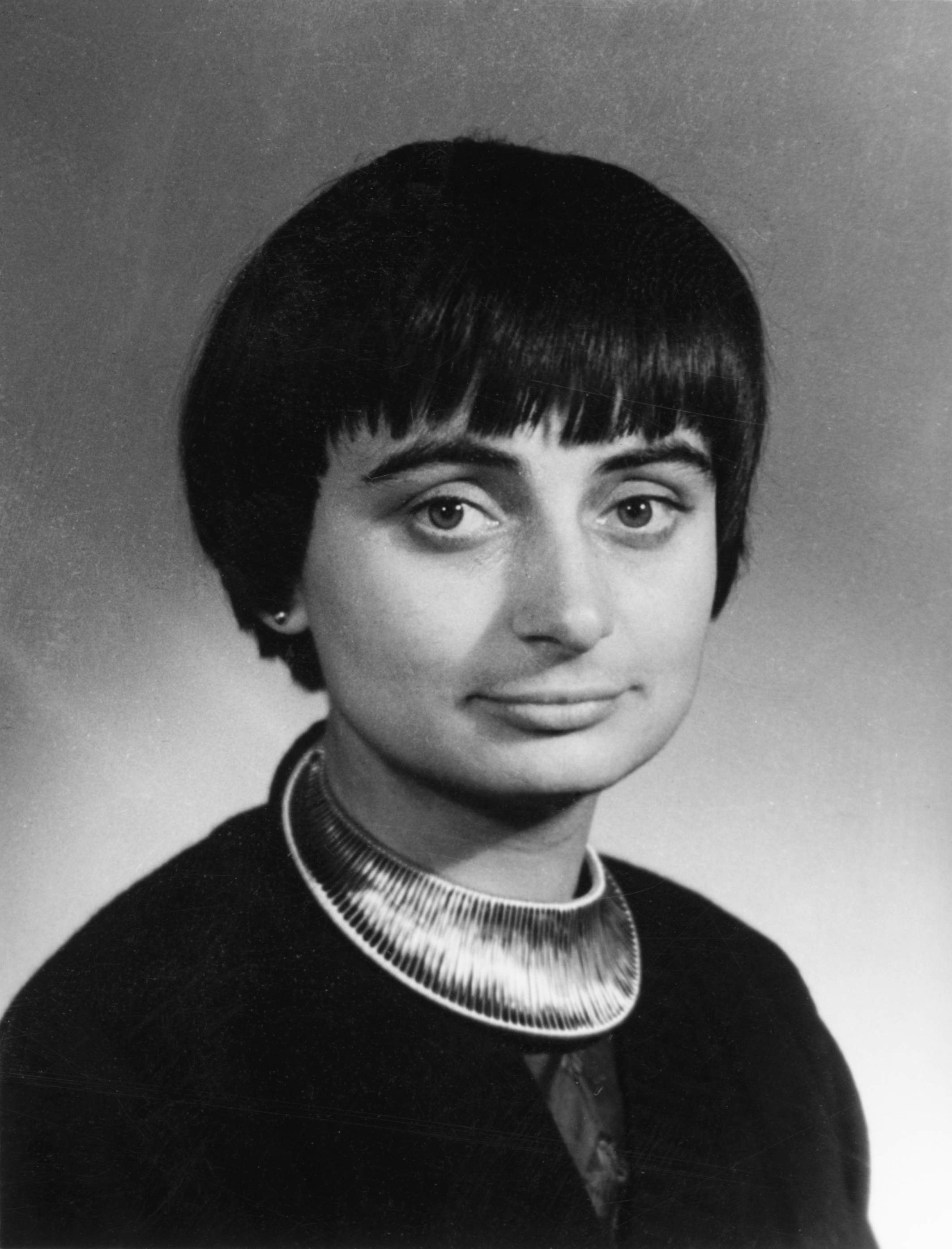
Agnès Varda won in 2015.

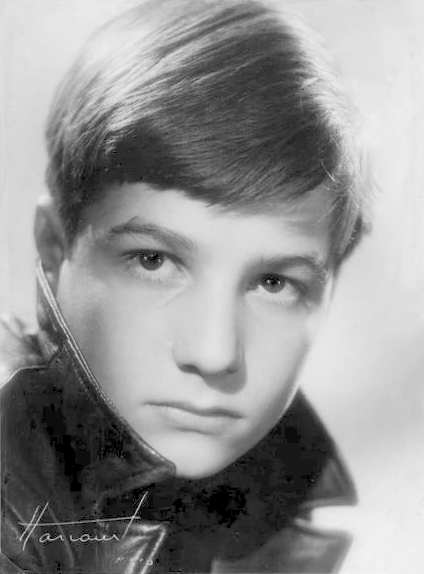
Jean-Pierre Léaud won in 2016.

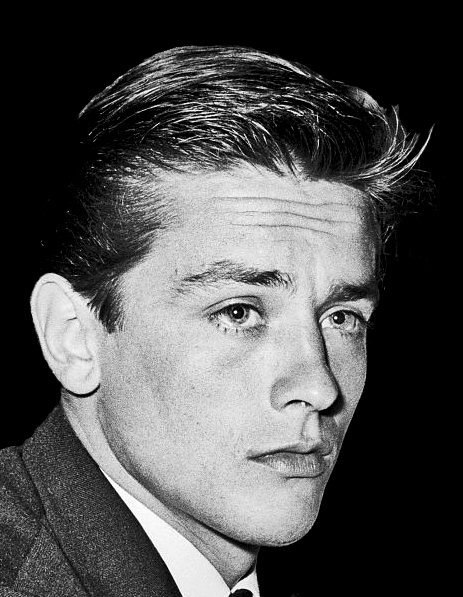
Alain Delon won in 2019.

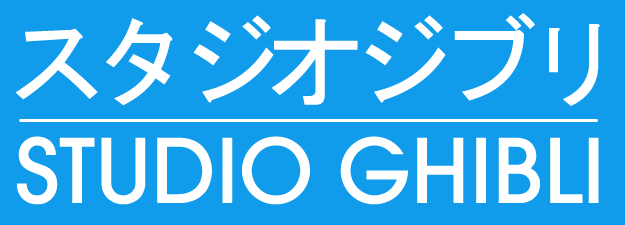
Studio Ghibli won in 2024.

=== 1990s ===
Year	Recipient	Profession	Nationality of Recipient	Ref.
1997	Ingmar Bergman	Filmmaker	Sweden	

=== 2000s ===
Year	Recipient	Profession	Nationality of Recipient	Ref.
2002	Woody Allen	Filmmaker and actor	United States	
2003	Jeanne Moreau	Actress	France	
2005	Catherine Deneuve	Actress	France	
2007	Jane Fonda	Actress and producer	United States	
2008	Manoel de Oliveira	Filmmaker	Portugal	
2009	Clint Eastwood	Actor and filmmaker	United States	

=== 2010s ===
Year	Recipient	Profession	Nationality of Recipient	Ref.
2011	Jean-Paul Belmondo	Actor	France	
2011	Bernardo Bertolucci	Filmmaker	Italy	
2015	Agnès Varda	Filmmaker	France	
2016	Jean-Pierre Léaud	Actor	France	
2017	Jeffrey Katzenberg	Producer	United States	
2019	Alain Delon	Actor	France	

=== 2020s ===
Year	Recipient	Profession	Nationality of Recipient	Ref.
2021	Marco Bellocchio	Filmmaker	Italy	
2021	Jodie Foster	Actress and filmmaker	United States	
2022	Forest Whitaker	Actor and producer	United States	
2022	Tom Cruise	Actor and producer	United States	
2023	Michael Douglas	Actor and producer	United States	
2023	Harrison Ford	Actor and producer	United States	
2024	Meryl Streep	Actress	United States	
2024	George Lucas	Filmmaker and producer	United States	
2024	Studio Ghibli	Animation studio	Japan	
2025	Robert De Niro	Actor and producer	United States	
2025	Denzel Washington	Actor, director, and producer	United States	
2026	Peter Jackson	Filmmaker and producer	New Zealand	
2026	Barbra Streisand	Actress, singer and filmmaker	United States	
2026	John Travolta	Actor	United States	

== See also ==
- Palme d'Or
- Academy Honorary Award
- Golden Globe Cecil B. DeMille Award
- Honorary César
- Honorary Golden Bear
- Honorary Goya Award
- Nastro d'Argento Lifetime Achievement Award
