= Boeing 737 MAX groundings =

2019–20 worldwide grounding of the Boeing 737 MAX

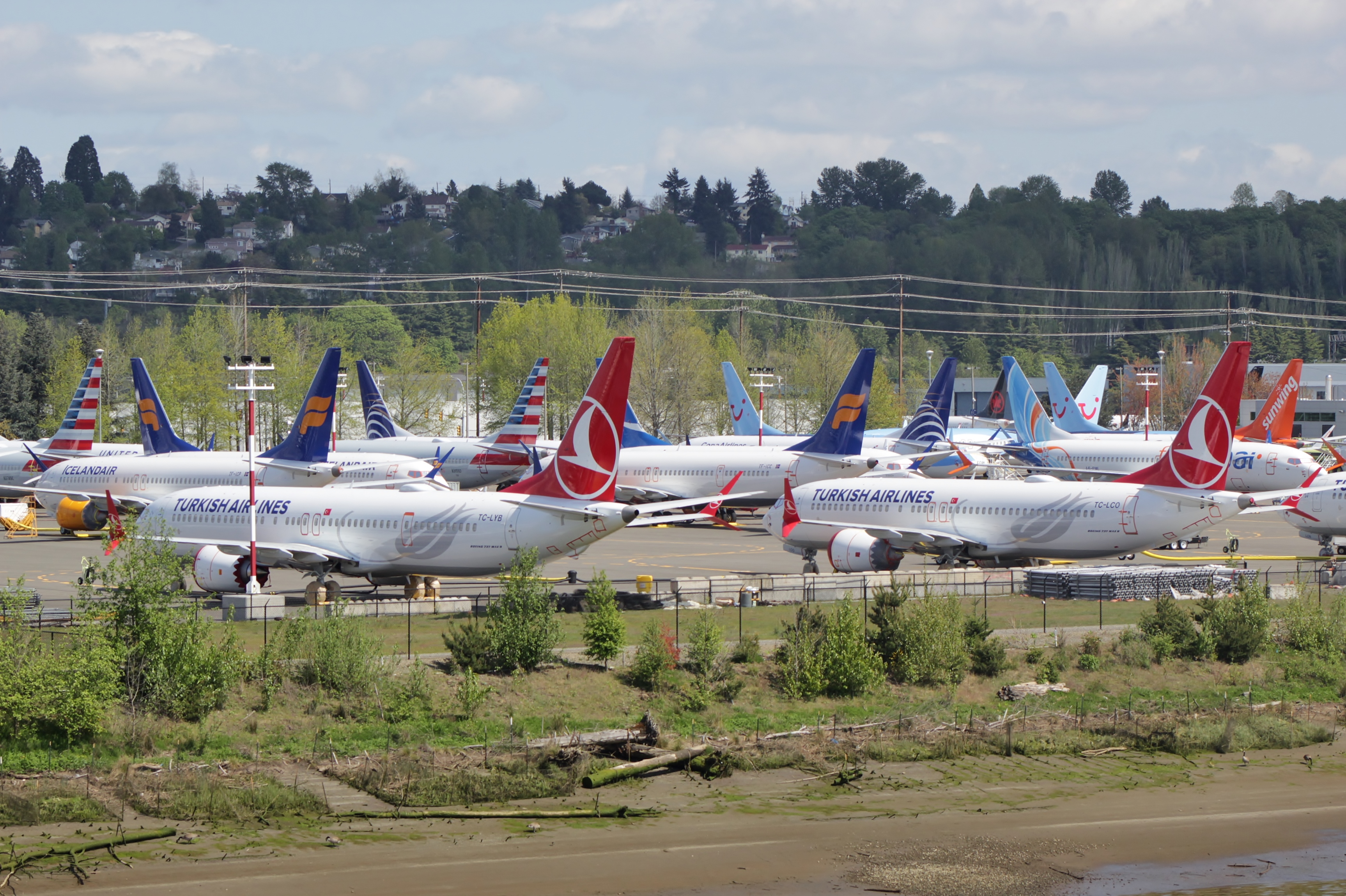
- A parking lot at Boeing Field in Seattle, Washington, filled with undelivered Boeing 737 MAX aircraft during the grounding following two fatal crashes
- Date: Lion Air accident: October 29, 2018; Ethiopian Airlines accident: March 10, 2019; First grounding: March 10, 2019 by Ethiopian Airlines (superseded); First grounding order: March 11, 2019 by the Civil Aviation Administration of China (CAAC) – January 13, 2023; FAA grounding order March 13, 2019 – November 18, 2020; Alaska Airlines accident: January 5, 2024; FAA EAD grounding of Boeing 737 MAX 9 with door plug installed: January 6, 2024
- Duration: Between accidents: 4 months and 10 days; Of grounding by the FAA: 1 year, 8 months and 5 days (619 days); 2024 737 MAX 9 grounding: 20 days
- Cause: 2019–2020 grounding: Airworthiness revoked after second fatal accident caused by flight control failure; 2024 grounding: Uncontrolled decompression of exit door plug failure
- Budget: Direct costs: US$20 billion; Indirect costs: US$60 billion
- Deaths: 346 total: 189 on Lion Air Flight 610; 157 on Ethiopian Airlines Flight 302

The Boeing 737 MAX passenger airliner was grounded worldwide between March 2019 and December 2020 after 346 people died in two similar crashes in less than five months, and briefly grounded in January 2024 following a dangerous in-flight accident.

The accidents leading to the 2019–2020 grounding were Lion Air Flight 610 on October 29, 2018 and Ethiopian Airlines Flight 302 on March 10, 2019. On March 11 the Federal Aviation Administration said it did not yet have data to take action. On March 13 the FAA said evidence showed "similarities" between the two crashes and grounded the aircraft, an action already taken after the second crash by 51 other regulators. All 387 aircraft delivered to airlines were grounded by March 18.

Official investigations concluded that a new automated flight control feature—the Maneuvering Characteristics Augmentation System (MCAS)—contributed to both crashes. During development of the airplane in 2016, the FAA approved Boeing's request to remove references to MCAS from the aircrew flight manual. In November 2018, after the Lion Air accident, Boeing instructed pilots to take corrective action in case of a malfunction in which the airplane entered a series of automated nosedives. Boeing avoided revealing the existence of MCAS until pilots requested further explanation. In December 2018, the FAA privately predicted that MCAS could cause 15 crashes over 30 years. In April 2019, the Ethiopian preliminary report stated that the crew had attempted the recommended recovery procedure, and Boeing confirmed that MCAS had activated in both accidents.

FAA certification of the MAX was subsequently investigated by the U.S. Congress and multiple U.S. government agencies, including the Transportation Department, FBI, NTSB, Inspector General and special panels. Engineering reviews uncovered other design problems, unrelated to MCAS, in the flight computers and cockpit displays. The Indonesian NTSC and the Ethiopian ECAA both attributed the crashes to faulty aircraft design and other factors, including maintenance and flight crew actions. Lawmakers investigated Boeing's incentives to minimize training for the new aircraft. The FAA revoked Boeing's authority to issue airworthiness certificates for individual MAX airplanes and fined Boeing for exerting "undue pressure" on its designated aircraft inspectors.

In August 2020, the FAA published requirements for fixing each aircraft and improving pilot training. On November 18, 2020, the FAA ended the 20-month grounding, the longest ever of a U.S. airliner. The accidents and grounding cost Boeing an estimated $20 billion in fines, compensation, and legal fees, with indirect losses of more than $60 billion from 1,200 cancelled orders. The MAX resumed commercial flights in the U.S. in December 2020, and was recertified in Europe and Canada by January 2021.

On January 5, 2024, Alaska Airlines Flight 1282 suffered a mid-flight blowout of a plug filling an unused emergency exit, causing rapid decompression of the aircraft. The FAA grounded some 171 Boeing 737 MAX 9s with a similar configuration for inspections. The Department of Justice believes Boeing might have violated its January 2021 deferred prosecution settlement. In July 2024, Boeing took ownership of the Alaska Airlines jet, pleaded guilty to criminal charges regarding the fatal accidents; and was ordered to allocate funds towards execution of an independently monitored safety compliance program, though the plea was later rejected by a federal judge due to diversity, equity, and inclusion requirements imposed in the deal regarding the selection of the independent monitor.

== Groundings ==
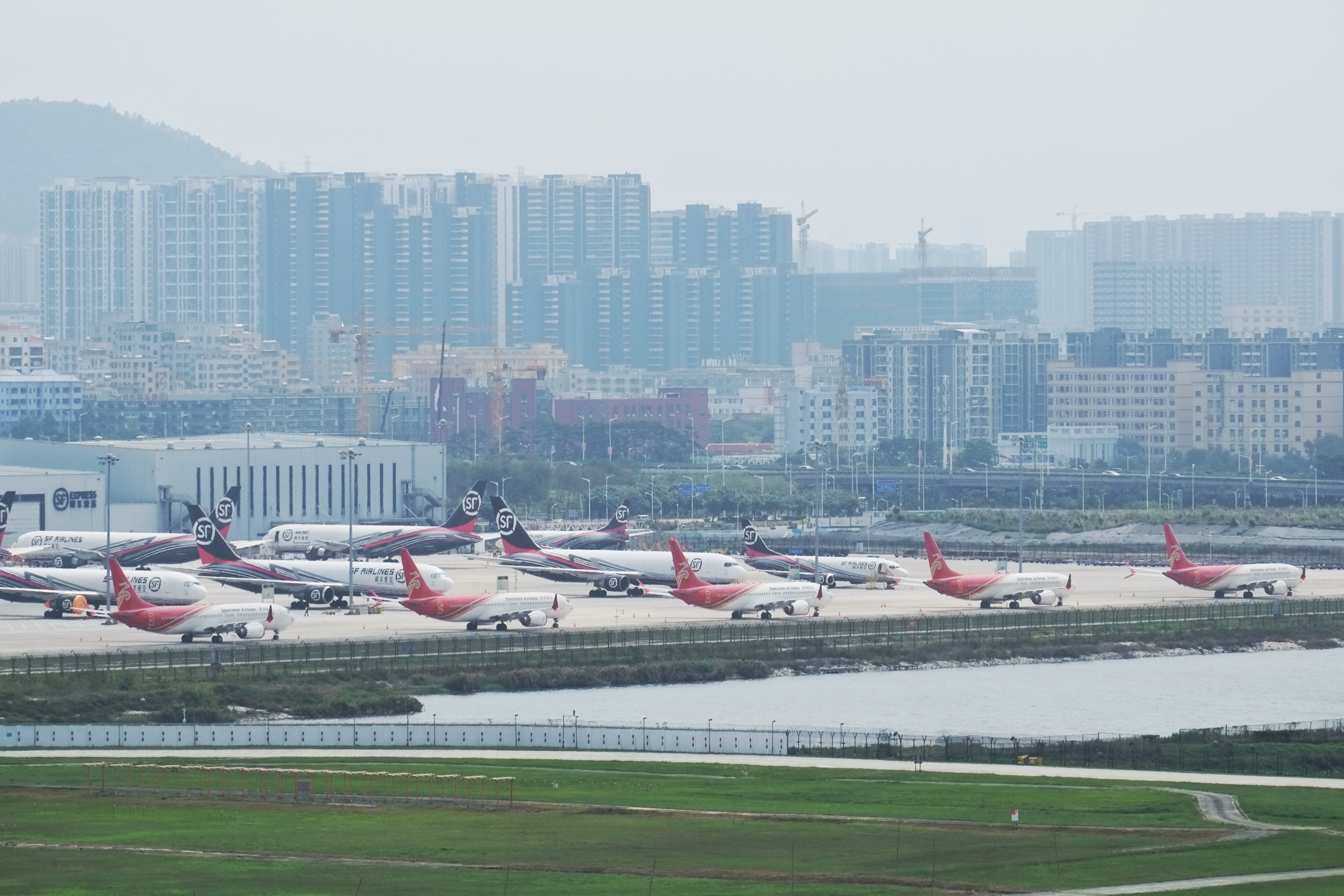
Five Shenzhen Airlines 737 MAX 8s (foreground, red livery) grounded at the Shenzhen Bao'an International Airport, March 2019.

After the Ethiopian Airlines crash, China and most other civil aviation authorities grounded the airliner over safety concerns. Other jurisdictions, including the U.S., followed suit as new evidence revealed similarities between both crashes. The groundings were ordered despite Boeing CEO Dennis Muilenburg's public assurances that the airplane was safe and a phone conversation with President Trump in which he "reiterated to the President our position that the MAX aircraft is safe", according to a Boeing statement. In response to increasing domestic and international pressure to take action, the U.S. Federal Aviation Administration (FAA) grounded the aircraft on March 13, 2019, reversing a Continued Airworthiness Notice issued two days prior. About 30 MAX aircraft were flying in U.S. airspace at the time and were allowed to reach their destinations. By March 18, every single Boeing 737 MAX plane (387 in total) had been grounded, which affected 8,600 weekly flights operated by 59 airlines across the globe. Several ferry flights were operated with flaps extended to prevent MCAS activation.

== Accident investigations ==
Vertical airspeeds of both flights, showing altitude loss in 20-second intervals.

ICAO regulations Annex 13, "Aircraft Accident and Incident Investigation", defines which states may participate in investigations. For the two MAX accidents these are:

1. Indonesia, for Lion Air Flight 610 as the state of registration, state of occurrence, and state of the operator.
2. Ethiopia, for Ethiopian Airlines Flight 302, as the state of registration, state of occurrence, and state of the operator.
3. The United States, as the state of manufacturer and issuer of the type certificate.

The participating state or national transportation safety bureaus are the NTSB for the US and the NTSC for Indonesia. Australia and Singapore also offered technical assistance, shortly after the Lion Air accident, regarding data recovery from the new generation flight recorders (FDR). With the exception of Ethiopia, the officially recognized countries are members of the Joint Authorities Technical Review (JATR).

=== Lion Air Flight 610 ===
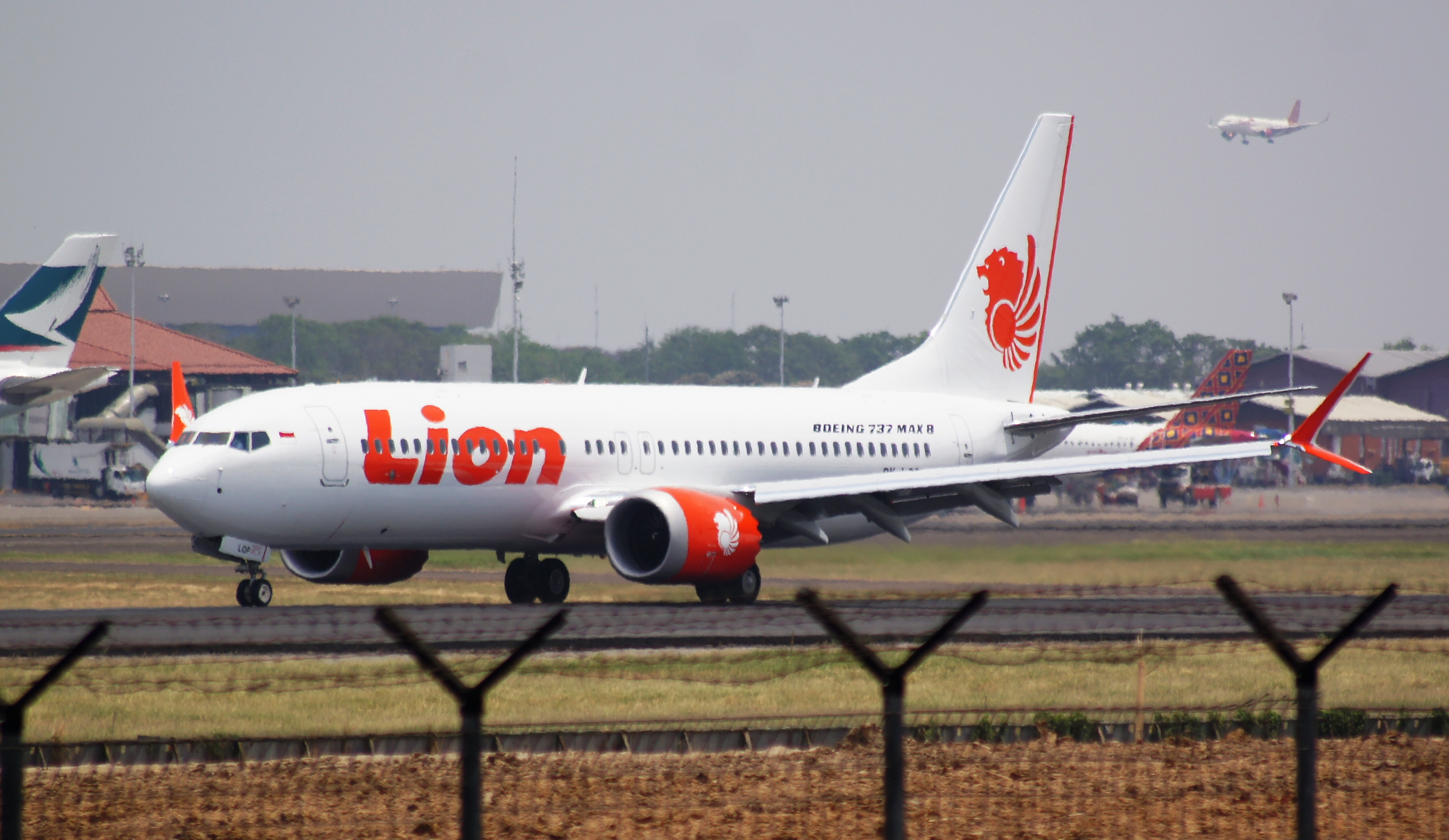
PK-LQP, the aircraft involved in the crash of Flight 610

Preliminary investigations revealed serious flight control problems that traumatized passengers and crew on the aircraft's previous flight, as well as signs of angle-of-attack (AoA) sensor and other instrument failures on that and the accident flight, tied to a design flaw involving the Maneuvering Characteristics Augmentation System (MCAS) of the 737 MAX series. The aircraft maintenance records indicated that the AoA sensor was replaced two days before the accident flight. The report tentatively attributed the accident to the erroneous angle-of-attack (AoA) data and automatic nose-down trim commanded by MCAS.

The NTSC final report, published on October 23, 2019, was prepared with assistance from the U.S. NTSB. NTSC's investigator Nurcahyo Utomo identified nine factors to the accident, saying:

The nine factors are the root problem; they cannot be separated. Not one is contributing more than the other. Unlike NTSB reports that identify the primary cause of accidents and then list contributing issues determined to be less significant, Indonesia is following a convention used by many foreign regulators of listing causal factors without ranking them.

The final report was shared with families of Lion Air Flight 610, then published on October 25, 2019.

=== Ethiopian Airlines Flight 302 ===
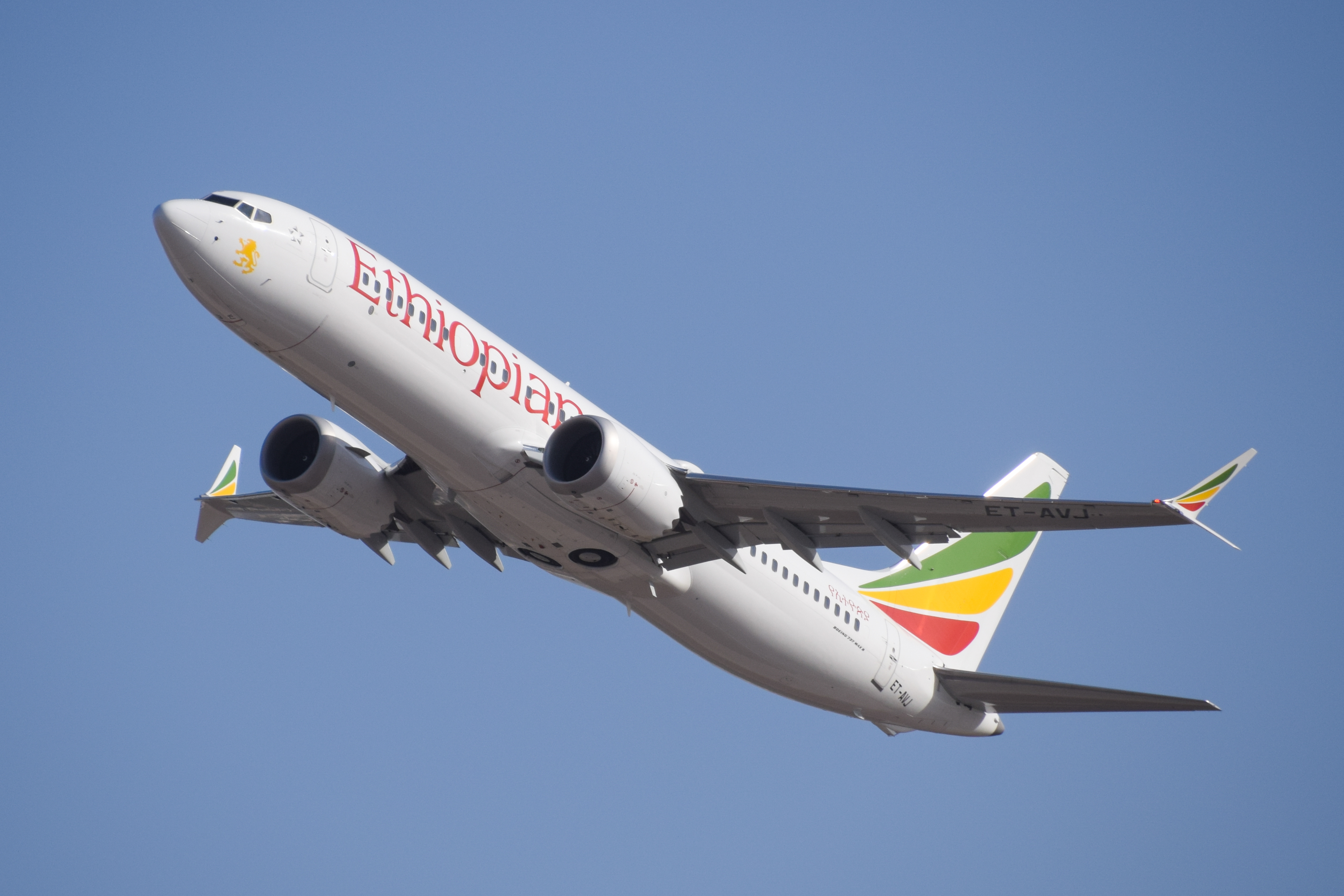
ET-AVJ, the MAX 8 that crashed as Flight 302

On March 11, the FAA defended the MAX against groundings by issuing a Continued Airworthiness Notice to operators. The initial reports for Flight 302 found that the pilots struggled to control the airplane in a manner similar to the Lion Air Flight 610 crash. On March 13, 2019, the FAA announced that evidence from the crash site and satellite data on Flight 302 suggested that it might have suffered from the same problem as Lion Air Flight 610 in that the jackscrew controlling the pitch of the horizontal stabilizer of the crashed Flight 302, was found to be set in the full "nose down" position, similar to Lion Air Flight 610. This further implicated MCAS as contributory to the crash.

Ethiopian Airlines spokesman Biniyam Demssie said that the procedures for disabling MCAS had just been incorporated into pilot training. "All the pilots flying the MAX received the training after the Indonesia crash," he said. "There was a directive by Boeing, so they took that training." While the pilots initially followed the correct procedure to disable runaway trim, they did not complete the checklist fully, and consequently, the recovery effort did not succeed.

The Ethiopian Civil Aviation Authority (ECAA) led investigations for Flight 302, and the United States Federal Aviation Administration assisted in the investigation. Both flight recorders (voice and data) were recovered from the crash site on March 11, 2019. The French aviation accident investigation agency BEA announced that it would analyze the flight recorders from the flight. BEA received the flight recorders on March 14, 2019.

On March 17, 2019, Dagmawit Moges, Ethiopia's transport minister, announced that the black box had been found and downloaded, and that the preliminary data retrieved from the flight data recorder show a "clear similarity" with those of Lion Air Flight 610 which crashed off Indonesia. Due to this finding, some experts in Indonesia suggested that the NTSC should cooperate with Flight 302's investigation team. Later in the evening, the NTSC offered assistance to Flight 302's investigation team, stating that the committee and the Indonesian Transportation Ministry would send investigators and representatives from the government to assist with the investigation of the crash.

The Ethiopian Civil Aviation Authority published an interim report on March 9, 2020, one day before the March 10 anniversary of the crash. Investigators tentatively concluded that the crash was caused by the aircraft's design. On December 23, 2022, the Ethiopian Aircraft Accident Investigation Bureau published its final report on the crash, concluding the probable cause was "Repetitive and uncommanded airplane-nose-down inputs from the MCAS", due to false input from the angle of attack (AoA) sensor.

== Timeline ==
=== 2016 ===
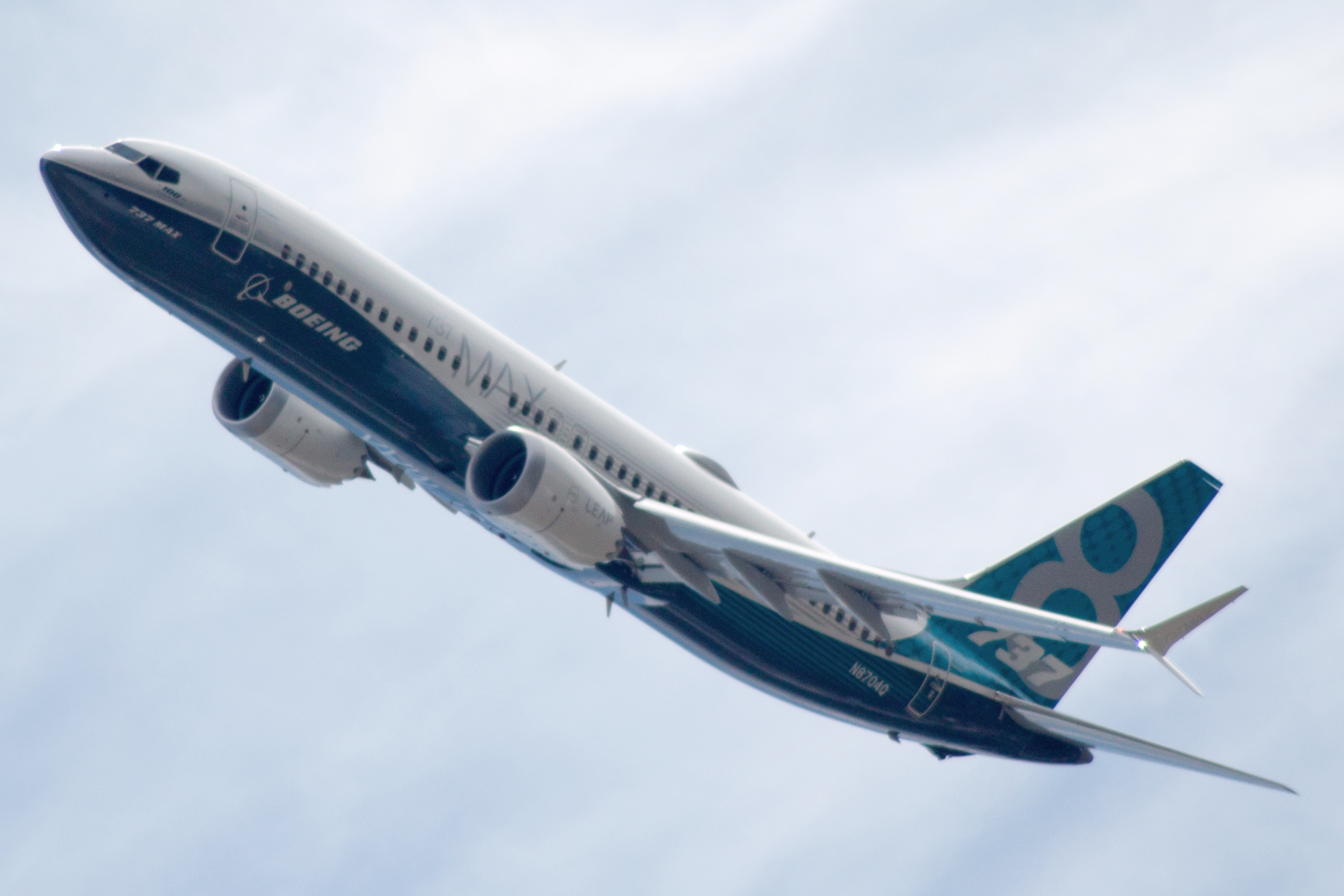
A MAX 8 at Farnborough Airshow

- March 2016, The General Manager of Boeing's 737 MAX program and the former Chief Project Engineer on the 737 MAX program both approved a redesign of MCAS to increase its authority to move the aircraft's stabilizer at low speed, in order to address "stall characteristics" requirements necessary for FAA certification. Just hours after the approval for MCAS's redesign was granted, Boeing sought, and the FAA approved, the removal of references to MCAS from Boeing's flight crew operations manual (FCOM). The FAA officials who authorized this request remained unaware of the redesign of MCAS until after the crash of the Lion Air flight.

=== 2018 ===
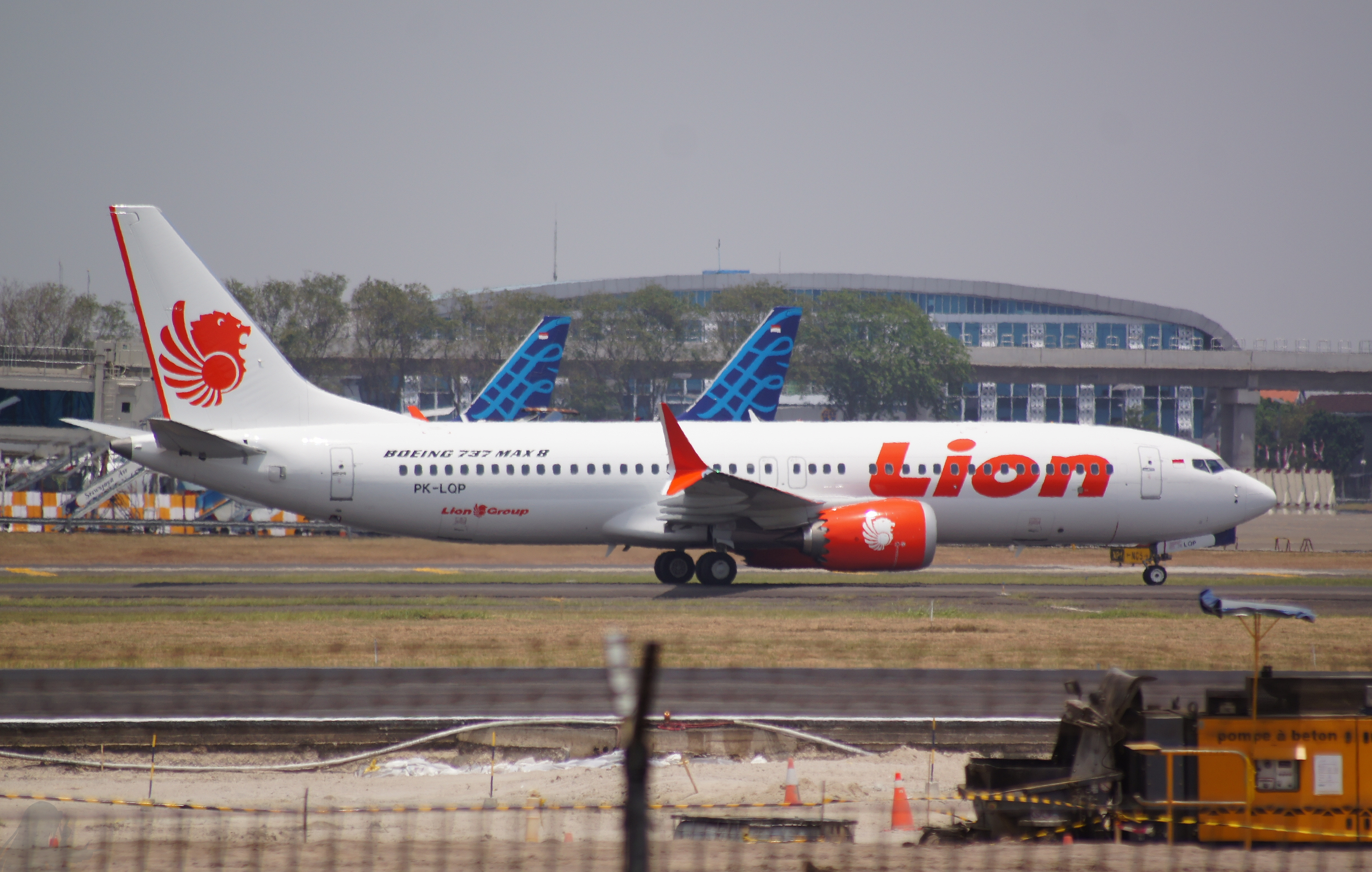
PK-LQP, the 737 MAX 8 involved in the Lion Air crash

- January 10, The Operational Evaluation Report of the National Civil Aviation Agency of Brazil (ANAC) mentions the MCAS. The FAA had approved Boeing's request to remove MCAS from differences tables and quick reference handbook (QRH); The Operational Evaluation Report prepared by Transport Canada contained the same table as ANAC's, except the reference to MCAS.
- October 29, a 737 MAX 8 operating Lion Air Flight 610 crashed after take-off from Jakarta, killing all 189 on board. Boeing started redesigning the MCAS system right after the accident.
- November 6, Boeing issued an Operations Manual Bulletin (OMB), describing a MAX-specific feature of the pitch trim system, warning that with "erroneous AoA data, the pitch trim system can trim the stabilizer nose down in increments lasting up to 10 seconds" which "can be stopped and reversed with the use of the electric stabilizer trim switches but may restart 5 seconds after" and instructed pilots to counteract it by running the Runaway stabilizer and manual trim procedure. The background introduction of the bulletin states: "This bulletin directs flight crews to existing procedures to address this condition", and reminds operators to use the "existing procedures in the Runaway Stabilizer NNC [Non-Normal Checklist]" when the MAX reacts to a false stall detection. This was Boeing's first public announcement about MCAS, albeit not by name.
- November 7, the FAA issued an Emergency airworthiness directive to owners and operators, requiring revising the aircraft flight manual (AFM) "to provide the flight crew with runaway horizontal stabilizer trim procedures" when "repeated nose-down trim commands" are caused by "an erroneously high single AoA sensor", reinforcing the Boeing bulletin. The FAA directive warned that the problem was an "unsafe condition" that could result in "impact with terrain". The directive informs pilots of a new function specific to MAX models : "Note: The 737-8/-9 uses a Flight Control Computer command of pitch trim to improve longitudinal handling characteristics. In the event of erroneous Angle of Attack (AoA) input, the pitch trim system can trim the stabilizer nose down in increments lasting up to 10 seconds." The FAA had removed reference to MCAS from its draft EAD.
- November 10, Boeing referred publicly for the first time to the MCAS by name in a Multi Operator Message to operators. The MCAS control law, a few lines of software code in the FCC, could autonomously command nosedives, when even a single sensor failure resulted in bad data; MCAS was omitted from aircraft manuals and training, therefore flight crews had no knowledge of its existence or functioning until Boeing published a bulletin on November 6.
- November 27, the Allied Pilots Association of American Airlines had a meeting with Boeing to express concerns with the MCAS effectiveness, and was unnerved by the airframer's responses. Union president Daniel Carey later said, "The huge error of omission is that Boeing failed to disclose the existence of MCAS to the pilot community. The final fatal mistake was, therefore, the absence of robust pilot training in the event that the MCAS failed". The Boeing officials acknowledged that they were considering some changes, for example preventing MCAS's repetitive activation to ensure that it only triggers once.
- December 3, the FAA Seattle Certification Office reviewed an unpublished quantitative risk assessment analysis of the MAX, prepared using the "Transport Aircraft Risk Assessment Methodology" (TARAM). The U.S. House Committee on Transportation and Infrastructure made the report public just over a year later, on December 11, 2019. In the committee's words, the report concluded that "if left uncorrected, the MCAS design flaw in the 737 MAX could result in as many as 15 future fatal crashes over the life of the fleet", predicting 2900 deaths over 30 years.
- December 17, in a presentation to the FAA, Boeing deflected blame and continued to assert that appropriate crew action would save the aircraft.

=== 2019 ===
- March 10, another 737 MAX 8 operating Ethiopian Airlines Flight 302 crashed shortly after take-off from Addis Ababa airport, killing all 157 on board, due to a similar faulty MCAS, initiating a worldwide flight ban for the aircraft, starting with China on March 11. This was followed in quick succession the following day, March 12 by Indonesia, Singapore, India, Turkey, South Korea, the European Union, Australia and Malaysia. See timeline and list of groundings by other countries and regions. The US FAA issued an affirmation of the continued airworthiness of the 737 MAX.
- March 13, the U.S. FAA was among the last to order the grounding of the 737 MAX, after claiming there was no reason: China had the most aircraft in service, 96, followed by the U.S. with 72, Canada with 39 and India with 21. The FAA issued an Emergency Order of Prohibition grounding Boeing 737 MAX airplanes, followed by a CANIC.
- March 20, EASA and Transport Canada indicated that they would conduct their own reviews of Boeing's proposed software update.
- March 27, Boeing unveiled a software update to avoid MCAS errors, which was pending certification after already being developed and tested in-flight.
- April 5, Boeing announced it was cutting 737 production by almost a fifth, to 42 aircraft monthly, anticipating a prolonged grounding, and had formed an internal design review committee.
- May 13, Republican Congressman Sam Graves at the House Aviation subcommittee hearing, blamed the 737 MAX crashes on poor training of the Indonesian and Ethiopian pilots; he stated that "pilots trained in the U.S. would have been successful" in handling the emergencies on both jets.
- June 18, IAG signed a letter of intent for 200 737 MAXs at the Paris Air Show, followed by Turkish SunExpress and Air Astana later in the year.
- June 26, flight tests for the FAA uncovered a data processing issue affecting the pilots' ability to perform the "runaway stabilizer" procedure to respond to MCAS errors.
- October 30, Boeing CEO Dennis Muilenburg testified before U.S. Congress committees, defending Boeing's safety culture and denying knowledge of internal messages in which Boeing's former chief technical pilot said he had unknowingly lied to regulators, and voiced his concerns on MCAS.
- November 22, Boeing unveiled the first 737 MAX 10 flight-test aircraft.
- November 26, the FAA revoked Boeing's Organization Designation Authorization to issue airworthiness certificates for individual MAX airplanes.
- December 17, Boeing confirmed the suspension of 737 MAX production from January 2020.
- December 23, Dennis Muilenburg was dismissed, to be replaced by board chairman Dave Calhoun.

=== 2020 ===
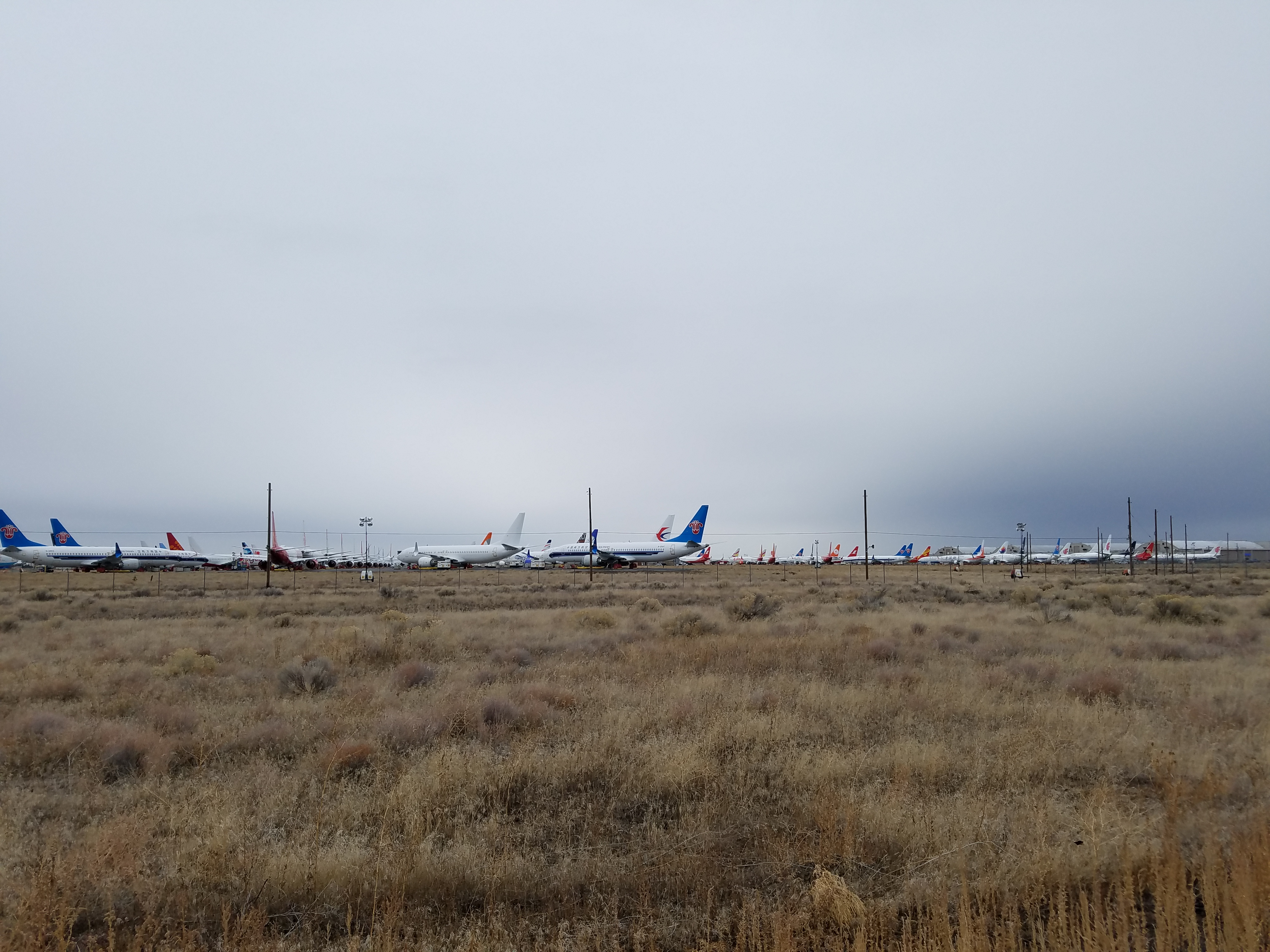
Grounded 737 MAX aircraft at the Grant County International Airport

- January 7, Boeing recommended "simulator training in addition to computer based training".
- January 9, Boeing released previous messages in which it claimed no flight simulator time was needed for pilots, and distanced itself from internal emails mocking airlines and the FAA, and criticizing the 737 MAX design.
- January 13, Dave Calhoun became CEO, pledging to improve Boeing's commitment to safety and transparency, and estimating the return to service in mid-2020.
- January 21, Boeing estimated the ungrounding could begin in mid-2020.
- May 27, Boeing resumed production of the MAX at a "very gradual pace".
- June 28 to July 1, the FAA conducted flight tests with a view to recertification of the 737 MAX.
- September 16, the U.S. House of Representatives released its concluding report, blaming Boeing and the FAA for lapses in the design, construction and certification.
- September 30, a Boeing 737 MAX test aircraft was flown by FAA administrator Stephen Dickson.
- October 16, Patrick Ky, the executive director of the European Union Aviation Safety Agency, claimed that the updated 737 MAX reached the level of safety "high enough" for EASA.
- November 18, the FAA issued a CANIC (Continued Airworthiness Notification to the International Community), subject to mandatory updates on each individual aircraft. (Note: install new flight control computer software and new display system software; incorporate certain Airplane Flight Manual flightcrew operating procedures; modify horizontal stabilizer trim wire routing installations; conduct an angle of attack sensor system test; and conduct an operational readiness flight) Other regulators were expected to follow.
- December 9, Brazilian low-cost carrier Gol Transportes Aéreos was the first airline to resume passenger service.
- December 29, American Airlines was the first US airline to resume commercial operations.

=== 2021 ===
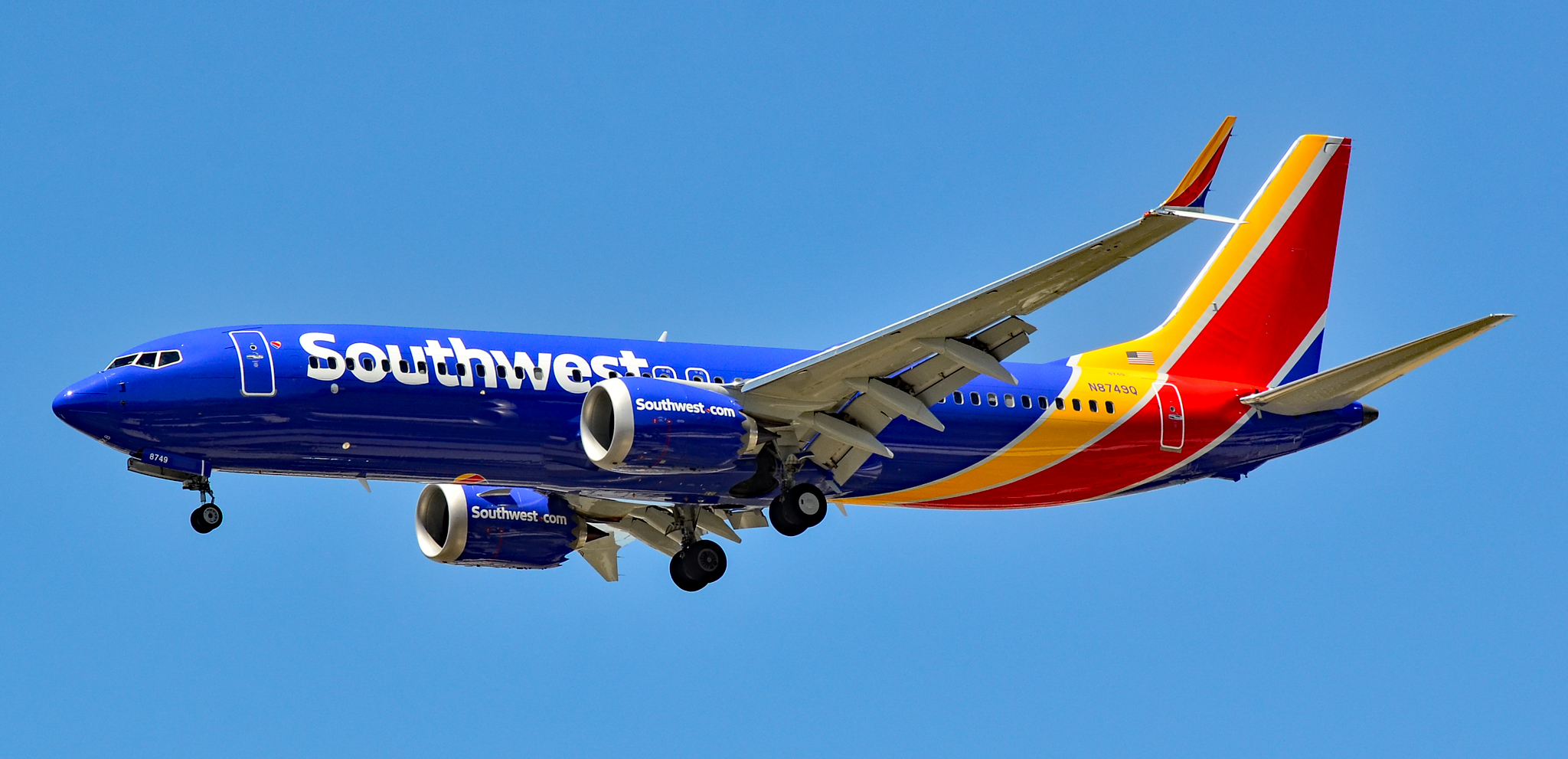
Southwest Airlines remains as the 737 MAX's largest operator. This Southwest MAX 8, registered as N8749Q, is seen on approach to Harry Reid International Airport, on June 8, 2021.

- January 7, Boeing settled to pay over $2.5 billion after being charged with fraud over the company's hiding of information from safety regulators: a criminal monetary penalty of $243.6 million, $1.77 billion of damages to airline customers, and a $500 million crash-victim beneficiaries fund.
- January 13, the Trinidad and Tobago Civil Aviation Authority authorized the MAX to resume flights in Trinidad and Tobago's airspace.
- January 18, Transport Canada authorized the MAX to resume flights in Canadian airspace. Canadian operators must modify the aircraft to enable pilots to disable the stick shaker when it is erroneously activated, if they are certain that they understand the underlying cause.
- January 27, EASA cleared the MAX to resume service in Europe, subject to additional restrictions similar to those mandated by Transport Canada. Certain approaches requiring precision navigation were however not yet approved as EASA was awaiting data from Boeing as to the aircraft's ability to maintain the required performance in the event of sensor failures.
- February 26, the Australian Civil Aviation Safety Authority lifted its ban on the MAX, accepting the return-to-service requirements set by the FAA. Australia was the first nation in the Asia-Pacific region to clear the aircraft to return to service.
- April 9, Boeing announces that it has notified 16 airlines and the FAA of a potential electrical problem. Boeing refused to say how many planes were affected but four airlines grounded nearly 70 MAX aircraft.
- August 26, the Indian Directorate General of Civil Aviation rescinds its ban on MAX airplanes in India on the condition that they meet the requirements set by the FAA and EASA.
- September 2, Boeing and Ethiopian Airlines reach an undisclosed out-of-court settlement, with Ethiopian Airlines announcing that the MAX could return to service in January 2022. The same day, the Civil Aviation Authority of Malaysia rescinded its ban on the MAX.
- October 14, federal prosecutors indict former Boeing pilot Mark Forkner for fraud, stating he lied to the FAA in an attempt to obtain money from customers. Forkner is the first person to receive criminal charges in the investigation.
- December 2, China's civil aviation regulator cleared the 94 jets stored by 11 carriers in China to fly again, before resuming deliveries in early 2022 of the ~120 planes currently stored by Boeing, as over 180 countries out of 195 have lifted the grounding.
- December 28, Indonesia's ministry of transport removes its ban on the MAX.

=== 2022 ===
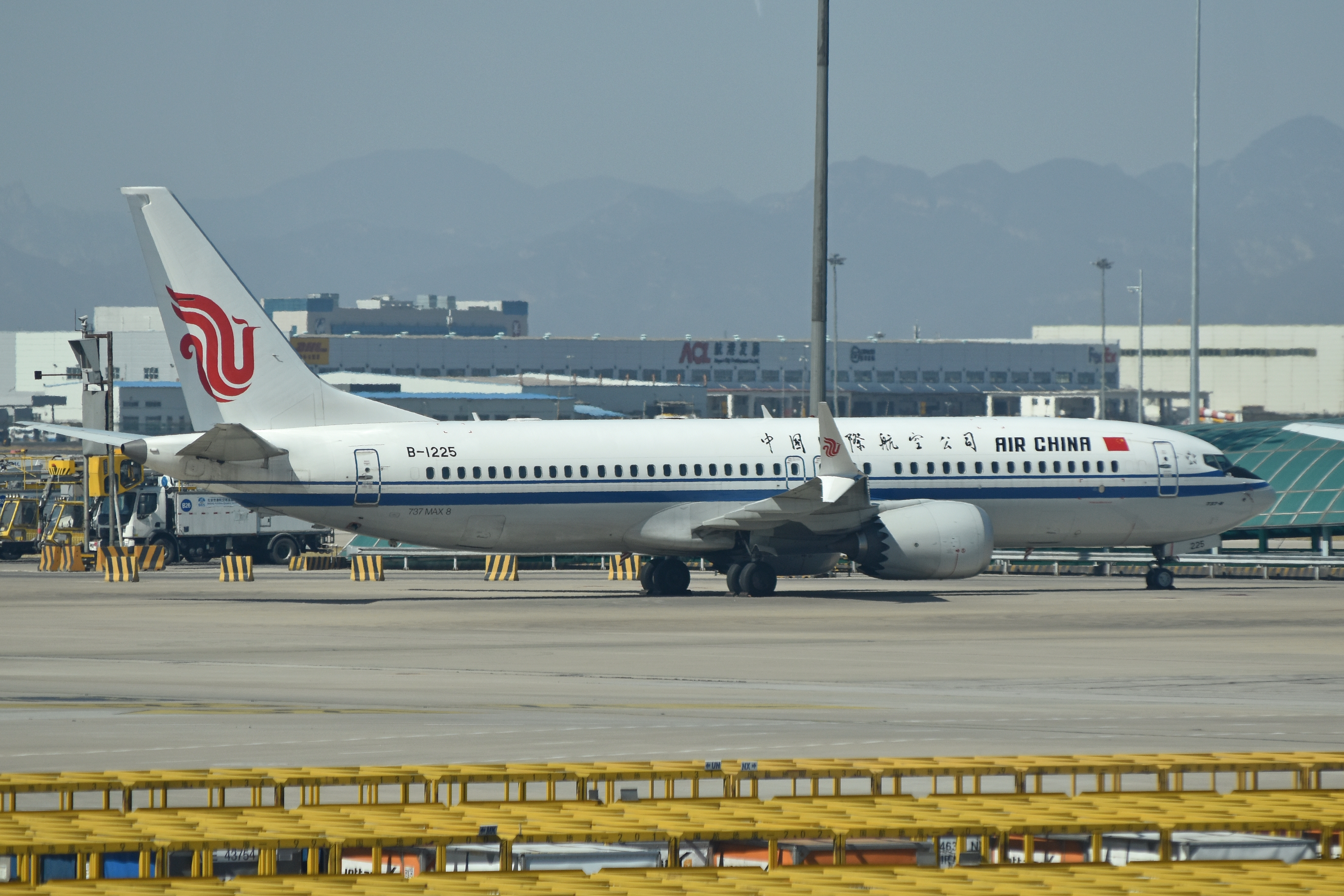
The CAAC grounded the 737 MAX in China until January 13, 2023, when Air China resumed operations of the type. This Air China MAX 8, registered as B-1225, was seen at Beijing Capital International Airport on March 11, 2019, the day after the crash of Ethiopian Airlines Flight 302.

- February 1, Ethiopian Airlines cleared the MAX to return to service, with a demonstration flight being held the same day.
- March 23, Mark Forkner is acquitted of fraud.

=== 2023 ===
- January 13, China Southern Airlines returned the MAX to service. In 2019, Chinese aviation authorities grounded all Boeing 737 MAX over safety concerns. The planes were allowed to return to service approximately 4 years later.
- In April 2023, it was revealed that US engineers had recommended grounding 737 MAX immediately following the Ethiopian Airlines accident.
- December 28, the FAA revealed that Boeing had asked airlines to check newer 737 MAX aircraft for a possible loose screw in the rudder control system. The FAA wants to "closely monitor" the targeted inspections and consider additional measures if further loose or missing components are discovered.

=== 2024 ===
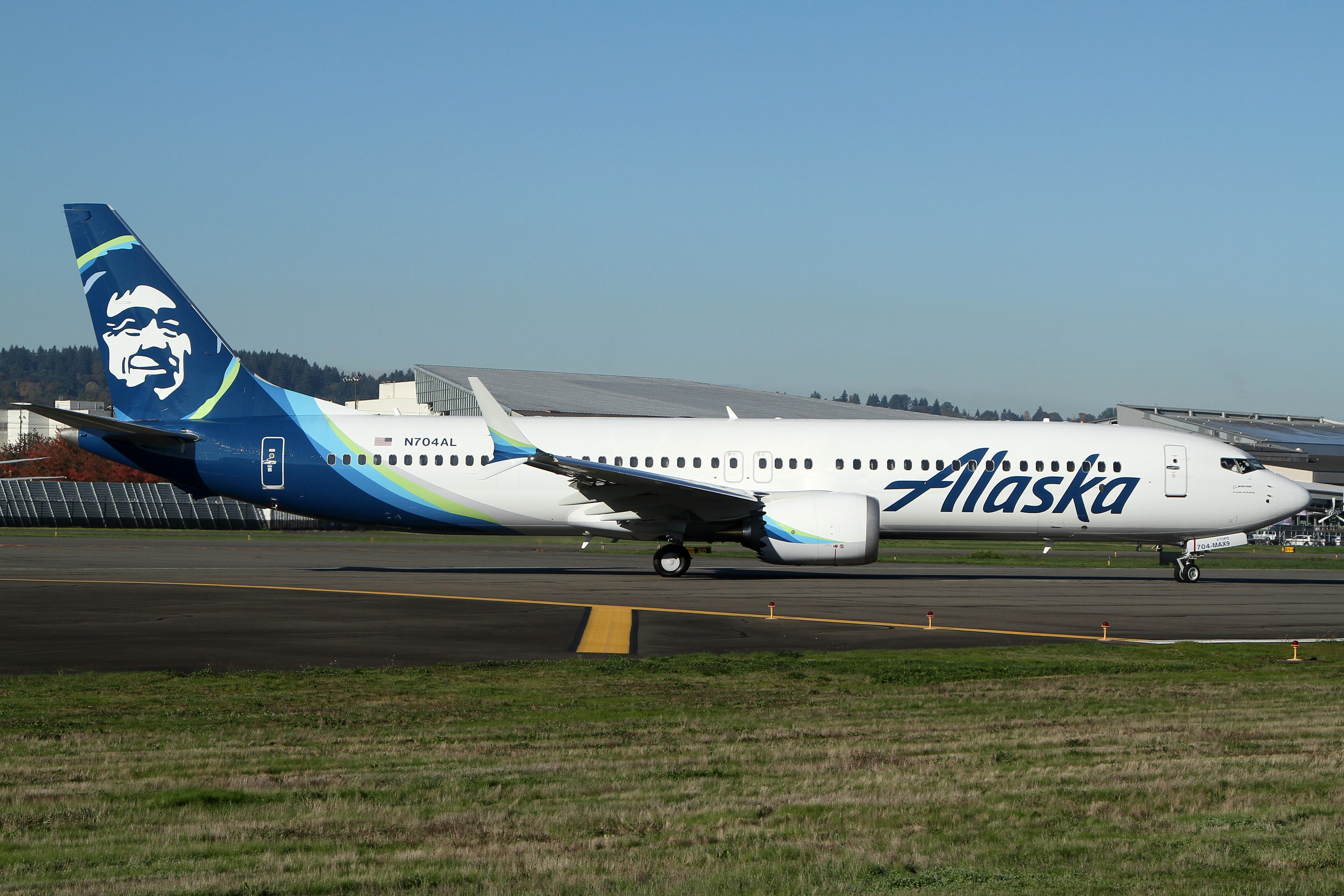
N704AL, the MAX 9 that the exit door plug blow out during takeoff as Flight 1282

- January 5: Alaska Airlines grounds their 737 MAX 9 fleet after a door plug blows out mid-air. Reports said the seat next to the left-hand panel, which contains an ordinary passenger window, was unoccupied. "This is a very, very serious situation and it could have been a lot worse," "If someone had been sitting in that seat, and they weren't buckled in, it would have been a different situation."
- January 6: the FAA issues an emergency airworthiness directive (EAD) mandating inspection of door plugs on 737 MAX 9 aircraft, temporarily grounding the 171 aircraft affected.
- January 7: EASA mandates inspection of affected 737 MAX 9 aircraft under its jurisdiction.
- January 8: the FAA approved a method to comply with the January 6 EAD. They also release a statement that all affected "aircraft will remain grounded until operators complete enhanced inspections which include both left and right cabin door exit plugs, door components, and fasteners. Operators must also complete corrective action requirements based on findings from the inspections prior to bringing any aircraft back into service."
- January 8: United Airlines and Alaska Airlines confirm in statements that they found loose bolts and other installation issues in the plug doors in multiple aircraft.
- January 11: The FAA announces an investigation into Boeing "to determine if Boeing failed to ensure completed products conformed to its approved design and were in a condition for safe operation."
- January 12: The FAA announces that they are auditing the 737 MAX production, increasing monitoring of "In-service events" and assessing the "safety risks around delegated authority and quality oversight"
- January 24: The FAA clears 737 MAX 9s with door plugs to return to service once inspections processes are complete.
- January 26: Alaska Airlines returns its 737 MAX 9 fleet to service.
- January 27: United Airlines clears its 737 MAX 9 fleet to resume service.
- March 7: A new investigation is launched after a United Airlines experienced stuck rudder pedals on February 6.
- March 9: Boeing whistleblower John Barnett, who had previously raised safety concerns about Boeing, commits suicide in South Carolina due to stress from a 2017 whistleblower case.
- March 11: The United States Department of Justice launches a criminal investigation into the Alaska Airlines incident.
- March 25: Dave Calhoun announces that he will step down as CEO at the end of 2024.
- May 4: Joshua Dean, who blew the whistle on Spirit Aerosystems and was fired a month earlier, dies due to a sudden illness.
- June 27: Boeing was sanctioned by the NTSB for holding a meeting with reporters on June 25 where the company shared information about the Flight 1282 investigation along with analysis of the facts without authorization.
- June 28: Alaska returns the aircraft involved in Flight 1282 to Boeing, to reduce storage and maintenance costs for the airline.
- June 30: Boeing agrees to buy back Spirit AeroSystems for $4.7 billion to bring 737 fuselage construction in-house. The deal is expected to close in mid-2025.
- July 7: Boeing agrees to plead guilty to a felony fraud charge in a deal with the US Justice Department. Boeing also agreed to pay a $487.2 million fine, spend at least $455 million over three years on compliance and safety programs and be supervised by an independent monitor. The plea deal is later rejected by a federal judge due to it containing DEI requirements for the selection of the independent monitor.

=== 2025 ===
- March 23: The justice department reaches a deal which grants the company to avoid criminal prosecution.
- November 12: A U.S. federal jury orders Boeing to pay $28.45 million in damages to the family of Shikha Garg, a victim of the 2019 Ethiopian Airlines 737 MAX crash, marking the first civil trial verdict related to the two fatal MAX accidents.

== Type certification and return to service ==
The Boeing 737 MAX was initially certified in 2017 by the U.S. Federal Aviation Administration (FAA) and the European Union Aviation Safety Agency (EASA). Global regulators grounded the plane in 2019 following fatal crashes of Lion Air Flight 610 and Ethiopian Airlines Flight 302. Both crashes were linked to the Maneuvering Characteristics Augmentation System (MCAS), a new automatic flight control feature. Investigations into both crashes determined that Boeing and the FAA favored cost-saving solutions, which ultimately produced a flawed design of the MCAS instead. The FAA's Organization Designation Authorization program, allowing manufacturers to act on its behalf, was also questioned for weakening its oversight of Boeing.

Boeing wanted the FAA to certify the airplane as another version of the long-established 737; this would limit the need for additional training of pilots, a major cost saving for airline customers. During flight tests, however, Boeing discovered that the position and larger size of the engines tended to push up the airplane nose during certain maneuvers. To counter that tendency and ensure fleet commonality with the 737 family, Boeing added MCAS so the MAX would handle similar to earlier 737 versions. Boeing convinced the FAA that MCAS could not fail hazardously or catastrophically, and that existing procedures were effective in dealing with malfunctions. The MAX was exempted from certain newer safety requirements, saving Boeing billions of dollars in development costs. In February 2020, the US Justice Department (DOJ) investigated Boeing's hiding of information from the FAA, based on the content of internal emails. In January 2021, Boeing settled to pay over $2.5 billion after being charged with fraud in connections to the crashes. The settlement included $243.6 million criminal fine for defrauding the FAA when it won the approval for the 737 MAX, $1.77 billion as compensation for airline customers, and $500 million as compensation for family members of crash victims.

In June 2020, the U.S. Inspector General's report revealed that MCAS problems dated several years before the accidents. The FAA found several defects that Boeing deferred to fix, in violation of regulations. In September 2020, the House of Representatives concluded its investigation and cited numerous instances where Boeing dismissed employee concerns with MCAS, prioritized deadline and budget constraints over safety, and where it lacked transparency in disclosing essential information to the FAA. It further found that the assumption that simulator training would not be necessary had "diminished safety, minimized the value of pilot training, and inhibited technical design improvements".

In November 2020, the FAA announced that it had cleared the 737 MAX to return to service. Various system, maintenance and training requirements are stipulated, as well as design changes that must be implemented on each aircraft before the FAA issues an airworthiness certificate, without delegation to Boeing. Other major regulators worldwide are gradually following suit: In 2021, after two years of grounding, Transport Canada and EASA both cleared the MAX subject to additional requirements.

== Maneuvering Characteristics Augmentation System ==
The MAX uses an adjustable stabilizer, moved by a jackscrew, to provide the required pitch trim forces. Generic stabilizer illustrated.

MCAS on the 737 MAX was designed to mimic the pitching behavior of the previous generation of the series, the Boeing 737 NG, by pushing down the aircraft nose from an elevated angle of attack (AoA) by automatically adjusting the horizontal stabilizer and trim tab. The system was intended to protect pilots from inadvertently flying at too steep an angle, which could result in a stall. Boeing, however, asserted that MCAS was not an anti-stall system, as the media widely reported it to be. Pilot movement of the control column on the MAX did not disable MCAS, unlike an earlier implementation of MCAS on the U.S. Air Force Boeing 767 Tanker. During certification of the MAX, Boeing requested and received permission from the FAA to remove a description of MCAS from the aircraft manual, leaving pilots unaware of the system when the airplane entered service in 2017. Boeing had also knowingly withheld knowledge, for at least a year before the Lion Air crash, that a system to warn of a possible AoA malfunction did not work as advertised.

On November 6, 2018, Boeing published a supplementary service bulletin prompted by the first crash. The bulletin says warnings triggered by erroneous AoA data could cause the pitch trim system to repeatedly push down the nose of the airplane and referred pilots to a "non-normal runaway trim" procedure as resolution, specifying a narrow window of a few seconds before the system would reactivate and pitch the nose down again. The FAA issued an emergency airworthiness directive, 2018-23-51, on November 7, 2018, requiring the bulletin's inclusion in the flight manuals, and that pilots immediately review the new information provided. Pilots wanted to know more about the issue, and Boeing responded by publicly naming MCAS for the first time in another message to airlines, noting that MCAS operates "without pilot input."

In December 2018, the FAA had privately predicted that 15 MCAS-related accidents could result if the system was not redesigned. Boeing said it would revise MCAS software by April 2019 to correct any problems. The study was only revealed a year later at the December 2019 House of Representatives hearing. Stephen Dickson, who became FAA administrator during the accident investigations, testified at the hearing about his agency's response after the Lion Air accident, saying "the result was not satisfactory".

After the March 2019 crash of Ethiopian Airlines Flight 302, Ethiopian investigators determined that pilots had attempted the recommended recovery procedure. Boeing admitted that MCAS played a role in both accidents by activating when it received faulty data from an exterior AoA sensor.

In 2020, an FAA Airworthiness Directive approved design changes for each MAX aircraft, requiring input from two AoA sensors for MCAS activation, elimination of the system's ability to repeatedly activate, and allowing pilots to override the system if necessary. Boeing also overhauled the computer architecture of the flight controls to provide greater redundancy. For each aircraft, the FAA would issue the airworthiness certificate, without delegation to Boeing, upon completion of an AoA sensor system test and a validation test flight. The FAA also required new simulator training specific to the MAX, including recovering from a simulated MCAS failure, before pilots may operate the MAX. Before the accidents, simulator training on the MAX was not required, because the FAA accepted Boeing's position that the MAX was sufficiently similar to the previous 737 series, the NG.

== Reactions ==
Boeing expressed its sympathy to the relatives of the Lion Air Flight 610 and Ethiopian Airlines Flight 302 crash victims, while simultaneously defending the aircraft against any faults and suggesting the pilots had insufficient training, until rebutted by evidence. After the 737 MAX fleet was globally grounded, starting in China with the Civil Aviation Administration of China the day after the second crash, Boeing provided several outdated return-to-service timelines, the earliest of which was "in the coming weeks" after the second crash. On October 11, 2019, David L. Calhoun replaced Dennis Muilenburg as chairman of Boeing, then succeeded Muilenburg's role as chief executive officer in January 2020.

One year after the crashes, lawmakers demanded answers from then-CEO Dennis Muilenburg in a hearing on Capitol Hill. They questioned him about the discovered mistakes leading to the crashes and also about Boeing's subsequent cover-up efforts. One important line of enquiry was how Boeing "tricked" regulators into approving sub-standard pilot training materials, especially the deletion of mentioning the critical flight stabilization system MCAS. A Texas court ruled in October 2022 that the passengers killed in two 737 MAX crashes are legally considered "crime victims", which has consequences concerning possible remedies.

Airbus articulated that the crashes had been a tragedy and that it would never be good for any competitor to see a particular aircraft type having problems. Airbus reiterated that the 737 MAX grounding and backlog would not change the production volume of the competing Airbus A320neo family as these aircraft had already been sold out through 2025 and logistical and supplier capacities could not be easily enhanced short to medium term in this industry.

Pilots' and flight attendants' opinions were mixed, with some expressing confidence in the certification renewal, while others were increasingly disappointed that Boeing had knowingly concealed the existence and the risks of the newly introduced flight stabilization system MCAS to the 737 series as more and more internal information about the development and certification process came to light. Retired pilot Chesley Sullenberger criticized the aircraft design and certification processes and reasoned that relationship between the industry and its regulators had been too "cozy".

== Financial and economic effects ==
The Boeing 737 MAX groundings have had a deep financial effect on the aviation industry and a significant effect on the national economy of the United States. No airline took delivery of the MAX during the groundings. Boeing slowed MAX production to 42 aircraft per month and halted MAX production from January to May 2020. Boeing suffered directly through increased costs, loss of revenue, reputational damage, victim litigation, client compensation, reduced credit rating, and decreased stock value. In January 2020, the company estimated a loss of $18.4 billion for 2019, and it reported 183 canceled MAX orders for the year.

In February 2020, the COVID-19 pandemic and resulting travel bans created further uncertainty for Boeing. In March 2020, news that Boeing was seeking a $60 billion bailout caused a steep drop in its stock price, though Boeing eventually received $17 billion in funds from the coronavirus stimulus. Its extensive supply chain providing aircraft components and flight simulators suffered similar losses, as did the aircraft services industry, including crew training, the aftermarket, and the aviation insurance industry. Major flight simulator supplier CAE increased production of simulators for the Boeing 737 MAX in anticipation of a jump in demand for pilot training in November 2019. At the time of the recertification by the FAA in November 2020, Boeing's net orders for the 737 MAX were down by more than 1,000 aircraft, 448 orders canceled and 782 orders removed from the backlog because they are no longer certain enough to rely on; the total estimated direct costs of the MAX groundings were US$20 billion and indirect costs over US$60 billion. On January 7, 2021, Boeing settled to pay over $2.5 billion after being charged with fraud.

== Popular culture ==
In September 2021, PBS released Boeing's Fatal Flaw, a Frontline documentary about how Boeing ignored critical safety issues with the 737 MAX resulting in the crash of two airliners.

In February 2022, Netflix released Downfall: The Case Against Boeing, a documentary about the two plane crashes directed by Rory Kennedy.

The Discovery Channel Canada / National Geographic TV series Mayday (also called Air Crash Investigation or Air Disasters) dramatised two separate episodes about the 2 incidents and the subsequent grounding of the Boeing 737 Max 8 entitled "Grounded: Boeing Max 8" (Season 21, Episode 4) and "Deadly Directive" (Season 24, Episode 10).

== See also ==
- 2013 Boeing 787 Dreamliner grounding: the aircraft was grounded for modifications to mitigate the risk of inflight fire
- Air France Flight 447: fatal accident following data and pitot tube failure and autopilot disablement
- Boeing 737 rudder issues
- Qantas Flight 72: data failure causing pitch down, severely injuring passengers
- Turkish Airlines Flight 1951: Dutch authorities have reopened the accident probe into this 2009 accident involving the prior generation 737-800 series aircraft.
- List of accidents and incidents involving the Boeing 737
