= ECAA =

ECAA may refer to:

- European Common Aviation Area
- Egyptian Civil Aviation Authority
- Ethiopian Civil Aviation Authority
