= List of Boeing 737 MAX groundings =

Grounded by government regulator Voluntarily grounded by all operating airlines

The Boeing 737 MAX airliner, which began service in 2017, was involved in two fatal accidents, Lion Air Flight 610 on October 29, 2018, and Ethiopian Airlines Flight 302 on March 10, 2019, that resulted from a malfunction of the aircraft's new flight stabilizing software, the Maneuvering Characteristics Augmentation System (MCAS).

After the Ethiopian Airlines crash, China and most other civil aviation authorities grounded the airliner over safety concerns. Other jurisdictions, including the U.S., followed suit as new evidence revealed similarities between both crashes. The groundings were ordered despite Boeing CEO Dennis Muilenburg's public assurances that the airplane was safe and a phone conversation with President Trump in which he "reiterated to the President our position that the MAX aircraft is safe", according to a Boeing statement. In response to increasing domestic and international pressure to take action, the U.S. Federal Aviation Administration (FAA) grounded the aircraft on March 13, 2019, reversing a Continued Airworthiness Notice issued two days prior. About 30 MAX aircraft were flying in U.S. airspace at the time and were allowed to reach their destinations. By March 18, every single Boeing 737 MAX plane (387 in total) had been grounded, which affected 8,600 weekly flights operated by 59 airlines across the globe. Several ferry flights were operated with flaps extended to prevent MCAS activation.

The grounding subsequently became the longest ever of a U.S. airliner.

== Regulating agencies ==
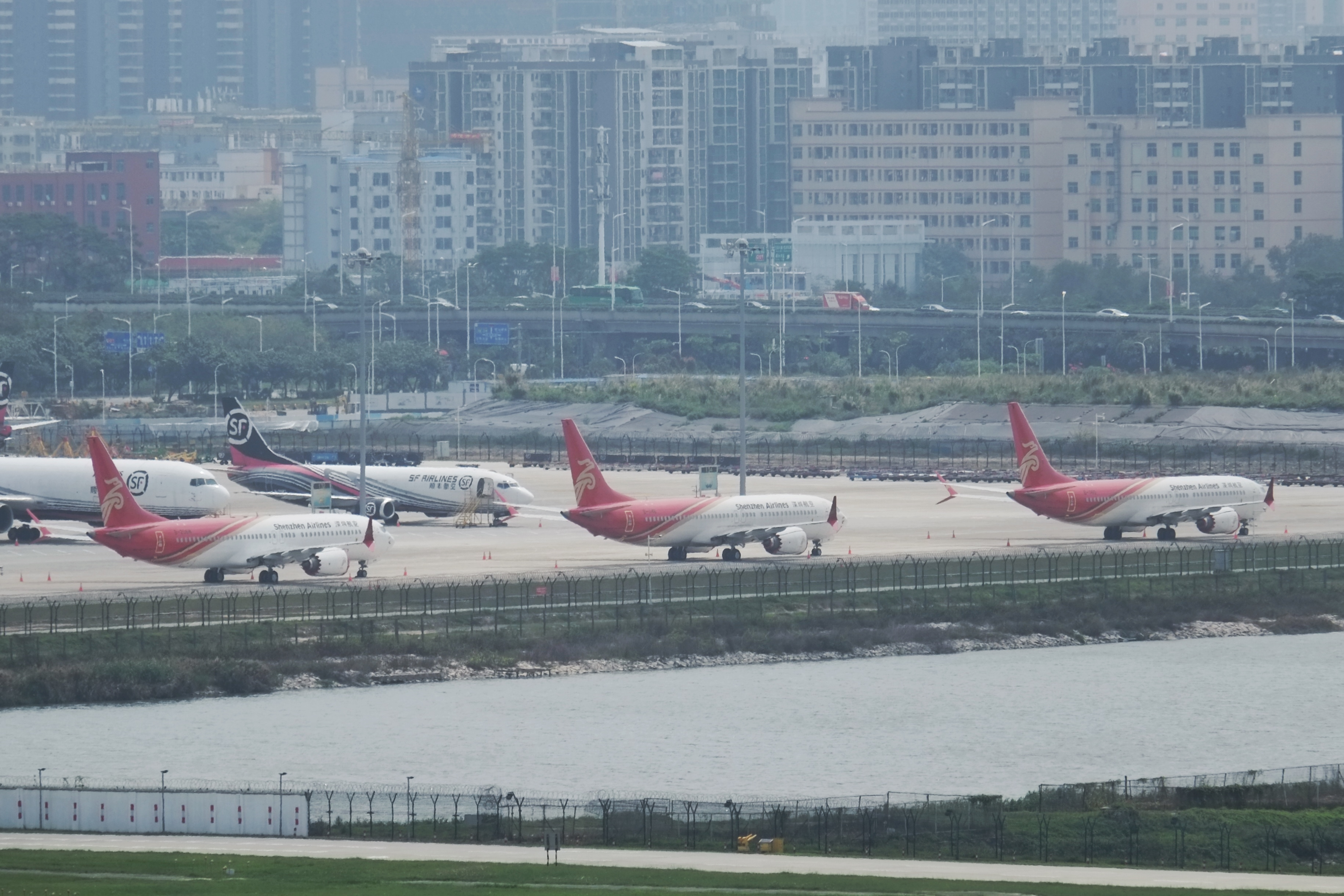
Boeing 737 MAX 8s of Shenzhen Airlines grounded at Shenzhen Bao'an International Airport in March 2019

Regulator grounding timeline 2019
Date	Authority	
March 11	China	Civil Aviation Administration
March 11	Indonesia	Ministry of Transportation
March 12	Australia	Civil Aviation Safety Authority
March 12	Austria	Ministry of Transport
March 12	Belgium	Federal Public Service Mobility and Transport
March 12	Bermuda	Civil Aviation Authority
March 12	Cayman Islands	Civil Aviation Authority
March 12	Equatorial Guinea	Civil Aviation Authority
March 12	European Union and EFTA	European Aviation Safety Agency (Note: Covers the European Union and the European Free Trade Association members)
March 12	Fiji	Civil Aviation Authority
March 12	France	Directorate General for Civil Aviation
March 12	Germany	Federal Ministry of Transport and Digital Infrastructure
March 12	India	Directorate General of Civil Aviation
March 12	Greece	Civil Aviation Authority
March 12	Ireland	Irish Aviation Authority
March 12	Italy	Civil Aviation Authority
March 12	Malaysia	Civil Aviation Authority
March 12	Netherlands	Human Environment and Transport Inspectorate
March 12	Oman	Directorate General of Civil Aviation and Meteorology
March 12	Poland	Civil Aviation Authority
March 12	Portugal	National Institute of Civil Aviation
March 12	Romania	Civil Aeronautical Authority
March 12	Singapore	Civil Aviation Authority
March 12	Turkey	Directorate General of Civil Aviation
March 12	United Arab Emirates	General Civil Aviation Authority
March 12	United Kingdom	Civil Aviation Authority
March 12	Vietnam	Civil Aviation Administration
March 13	Albania	Civil Aviation Authority
March 13	Armenia	General Department of Civil Aviation
March 13	Bangladesh	Civil Aviation Authority
March 13	Brazil	National Civil Aviation Agency
March 13	Brunei	Department of Civil Aviation
March 13	Bulgaria	Civil Aviation Administration
March 13	Canada	Transport Canada Civil Aviation
March 13	Chile	Directorate General of Civil Aviation
March 13	Colombia	Special Administrative Unit of Civil Aeronautics
March 13	Costa Rica	Dirección General de Aviación Civil
March 13	Cyprus	Department of Civil Aviation
March 13	Denmark	Danish Transport Authority
March 13	Djibouti	Civil Aviation Authority
March 13	Egypt	Ministry of Civil Aviation
March 13	Georgia	Civil Aviation Administration
March 13	Hong Kong	Civil Aviation Department
March 13	Iraq	Iraq Civil Aviation Authority
March 13	Israel	Civil Aviation Authority
March 13	Jamaica	Civil Aviation Authority
March 13	Kosovo	Civil Aviation Authority
March 13	Kuwait	Directorate General of Civil Aviation
March 13	Lebanon	Civil Aviation Authority
March 13	Macau	Civil Aviation Authority
March 13	Moldova	Civil Aviation Authority
March 13	Montenegro	Civil Aviation Agency
March 13	Namibia	Civil Aviation Authority
March 13	New Zealand	Civil Aviation Authority
March 13	Nigeria	Civil Aviation Authority
March 13	North Macedonia	Civil Aviation Agency
March 13	Panama	Civil Aviation Authority
March 13	Senegal	Agence Nationale de l'Aviation Civile et de la Météorologie
March 13	Seychelles	Civil Aviation Authority
March 13	Thailand	Civil Aviation Authority
March 13	Trinidad and Tobago	Civil Aviation Authority
March 13	Ukraine	State Aviation Administration
March 13	United States	Federal Aviation Administration
March 13	Uzbekistan	Civil Aviation Agency
March 14	Belarus	Department for Aviation
March 14	Bosnia and Herzegovina	Directorate of Civil Aviation
March 14	Ethiopia	Civil Aviation Authority
March 14	Gabon	Agence Nationale de l'Aviation Civile
March 14	Japan	Ministry of Land, Infrastructure, Transport and Tourism
March 14	Kazakhstan	Civil Aviation Committee
March 14	Kiribati	Ministry of Information, Communications, Transport and Tourism Development
March 14	Mexico	Directorate General of Civil Aeronautics
March 14	Papua New Guinea	Civil Aviation Authority
March 14	Russia	Federal Air Transport Agency
March 14	Rwanda	Civil Aviation Authority
March 14	Serbia	Civil Aviation Directorate
March 14	South Korea	Ministry of Land, Infrastructure and Transport
March 14	Taiwan	Civil Aeronautics Administration (Note: Taiwan CAA announced airspace closures similar to Japan, stating that the FAA grounding would affect all operators.)
March 15	Guatemala	Dirección General de Aeronáutica Civil
March 15	Iran	Civil Aviation Organization
March 15	Paraguay	Dirección Nacional de Aeronáutica
March 16	Argentina	National Civil Aviation Administration
March 18	Algeria	Directorate of Civil Aviation and Meteorology
March 18	Uruguay	National Civil Aviation and Aviation Infrastructure Direction

March 11

- China: The Civil Aviation Administration of China ordered all domestic airlines to suspend operations of all 737 MAX 8 aircraft by 18:00 local time (10:00 GMT), pending the results of the investigation, thus grounding all 96 Boeing 737 MAX planes (c. 25% of all delivered) in China.
- United States: The FAA issued an affirmation of the continued airworthiness of the 737 MAX. The FAA stated that it had no evidence from the crashes to justify regulatory action against the aircraft.
- Indonesia: Nine hours after China's grounding, the Indonesian Ministry of Transportation issued a temporary suspension on the operation of all eleven 737 MAX 8 aircraft in Indonesia. A nationwide inspection on the type was expected to take place on March 12 to "ensure that aircraft operating in Indonesia are in an airworthy condition".
- Mongolia: Civil Aviation Authority of Mongolia (MCAA) said in a statement "MCAA has temporarily stopped the 737 MAX flight operated by MIAT Mongolian Airlines from March 11, 2019."

March 12

- Singapore: the Civil Aviation Authority of Singapore, "temporarily suspends" operation of all variants of the 737 MAX aircraft into and out of Singapore.
- India: Directorate General of Civil Aviation (DGCA) released a statement "DGCA has taken the decision to ground the 737 MAX aircraft immediately, pursuant to new inspections.
- Turkey: Directorate General of Civil Aviation suspended flights of 737 MAX 8 and 9 type aircraft being operated by Turkish companies in Turkey, and stated that they are also reviewing the possibility of closing the country's airspace for the same.
- South Korea: Ministry of Land, Infrastructure and Transport (MOLIT) advised Eastar Jet, the only airline of South Korea to possess Boeing 737 MAX aircraft to ground their models, and three days later issued a NOTAM (Notice to Airmen) message to block all Boeing 737 MAX models from landing and departing from all domestic airports.
- European Union: The European Union Aviation Safety Agency (EASA) suspended all flight operations of all 737-8 MAX and 737-9 MAX in the European Union. In addition, EASA published a Safety Directive, published at 18:23, effective as of 19:00 UTC, suspending all commercial flights performed by third-country operators into, within or out of the EU of the above mentioned models The reasons invoked include: "Technical decision, data driven, precautionary measure: Similarities with the Lion Air accident data; Application of EASA guidance material for taking corrective actions in case of potential unsafe conditions; Additional considerations: no direct access to the investigation, unusual scenario of a 'young' aircraft experiencing 2 fatal accidents in less than 6 months".
- Canada: Minister of Transport Marc Garneau said it was premature to consider groundings and that, "If I had to fly somewhere on that type of aircraft today, I would."
- Australia: The Civil Aviation Safety Authority banned Boeing 737 MAX from Australian airspace.
- Malaysia: The Civil Aviation Authority of Malaysia suspended the operations of the Boeing 737 MAX 8 aircraft flying to or from Malaysia and transiting in Malaysia.

March 13

- Canada: Minister of Transport Marc Garneau, prompted by receipt of new information, said "There can't be any MAX 8 or MAX 9 flying into, out of or across Canada", effectively grounding all 737 MAX aircraft in Canadian airspace.
- United States: President Donald Trump announced on March 13, that United States authorities would ground all 737 MAX 8 and MAX 9 aircraft in the United States. After the President's announcement, the FAA officially ordered the grounding of all 737 MAX 8 and 9 operated by U.S. airlines or in the United States airspace. The FAA did allow airlines to make ferry flights without passengers or flight attendants in order to reposition the aircraft in central locations.
- Hong Kong: The Civil Aviation Department banned the operation of all 737 MAX aircraft into, out of and over Hong Kong.
- Panama: The Civil Aviation Authority grounded its aircraft.
- Vietnam: The Civil Aviation Authority of Vietnam banned Boeing 737 MAX aircraft from flying over Vietnam.
- New Zealand: The Civil Aviation Authority of New Zealand suspended Boeing 737 MAX aircraft from its airspace.
- Mexico: Mexico's civil aviation authority suspended flights by Boeing 737 MAX 8 and MAX 9 aircraft in and out of the country.
- Brazil: The National Civil Aviation Agency (ANAC) suspended the 737 MAX 8 aircraft from flying.
- Colombia: Colombia's civil aviation authority banned Boeing 737 MAX 8 planes from flying over its airspace.
- Chile: The Directorate General of Civil Aviation banned Boeing 737 MAX 8 flights in the country's airspace.
- Trinidad and Tobago: The Director General of Civil Aviation banned Boeing 737 MAX 8 and 9 planes from use in civil aviation operations within and over Trinidad and Tobago.

March 14

- Taiwan: The Civil Aeronautics Administration banned Boeing 737 MAX from entering, leaving or flying over Taiwan.
- Japan: Japan's transport ministry banned flights by Boeing 737 MAX 8 and 9 aircraft from its airspace.

March 16

- Argentina: The National Civil Aviation Administration (ANAC) closed airspace to Boeing 737 MAX flights.

June 27

- Belgium issued a NOTAM extending the 737 MAX 8 and MAX 9 ban until 2020.

== Airlines ==
After the Ethiopian Airlines crash, some airlines proactively grounded their fleets and regulatory bodies grounded the others. (This list includes 6 more 737 MAX aircraft than the official FAA record; these aircraft may have powered on their transponders, but not delivered to an airline. Some pre-delivered aircraft are located at Boeing Field, Renton Municipal Airport and Paine Field airports).

Airline groundings timeline and fleet size
Date	Airline	Fleet size
March 10	Ethiopian Airlines	4
March 11	Aerolíneas Argentinas	5
March 11	Air China	15
March 11	Cayman Airways	2
March 11	China Eastern Airlines	3
March 11	China Southern Airlines	24
March 11	Comair	2
March 11	Eastar Jet	2
March 11	Fuzhou Airlines	2
March 11	Garuda Indonesia	1
March 11	Gol Transportes Aéreos	7
March 11	Hainan Airlines	11
March 11	Kunming Airlines	2
March 11	Lion Air	10
March 11	Lucky Air	3
March 11	MIAT Mongolian Airlines	1
March 11	Okay Airways	2
March 11	Royal Air Maroc	2
March 11	Shandong Airlines	7
March 11	Shanghai Airlines	12
March 11	Shenzhen Airlines	6
March 11	XiamenAir	10
March 12	9 Air	3
March 12	Aeroméxico	6
March 12	Air Italy	4
March 12	Corendon Airlines	1
March 12	Enter Air	2
March 12	Fiji Airways	2
March 12	Flydubai	15
March 12	Icelandair	6
March 12	Jet Airways	8
March 12	LOT Polish Airlines	5
March 12	Mauritania Airlines	1
March 12	Norwegian Air International	9
March 12	Norwegian Air Shuttle	6
March 12	Norwegian Air Sweden	3
March 12	S7 Airlines	2
March 12	SilkAir	6
March 12	Smartwings	8
March 12	Sunwing Airlines	4
March 12	TUI Airways	6
March 12	TUI fly Belgium	4
March 12	TUI fly Netherlands	3
March 12	TUI fly Nordic	2
March 12	Turkish Airlines	14
March 13	Air Canada	24
March 13	American Airlines	24
March 13	Copa Airlines	6
March 13	Southwest Airlines	34
March 13	SCAT Airlines	1
March 13	SpiceJet	13
March 13	Thai Lion Air	3
March 13	United Airlines	14
March 13	WestJet	13
March 15	Oman Air	5
Unknown	Samoa Airways	1
Unknown	TUI fly Deutschland	1
Total		393

=== Effect on MAX flights ===
At the time of its grounding, the MAX was operating 8,600 flights per week.

About thirty Boeing 737 MAX aircraft were airborne in U.S. airspace when the FAA grounding order was announced. The airplanes were allowed to continue to their destinations and were then grounded. In Europe, several flights were diverted when grounding orders were issued. For example, an Israel-bound Norwegian 737 MAX aircraft returned to Stockholm, and two Turkish Airlines MAX aircraft flying to Britain, one to Gatwick Airport south of London and the other to Birmingham, turned around and flew back to Turkey.

On June 11, 2019, Norwegian Flight DY8922 attempted a ferry flight from Málaga, Spain to Stockholm, Sweden. However, the aircraft was refused entry into German airspace, and diverted to Châlons Vatry, France.

In a rare exemption, Transport Canada approved eleven flights in August and September 2019, partly to maintain the qualifications of senior Air Canada training pilots, because the airline has no earlier-generation 737s within its fleet. The airline used the MAX during planned maintenance movements, and ultimately flew it to Pinal Airpark in Arizona for storage.

In early October 2019, Icelandair moved two of its five MAX 8s for winter storage in the milder climate of northern Spain, making the entire flight with flaps extended to prevent MCAS activation.

The Grounding ended in 2020

== January 2024 grounding ==
After the Alaska Airlines flight 1282 crash, the FAA issued a Emergency airworthiness directive and ordered inspections to all Boeing 737 MAX 9 operating in US territory.

Timeline	What Happened
6 January 2024	FAA issues an EAD for all Boeing 737 MAX 9's operating in US territory
January 2024	Halted production expansion of the Boeing 737 MAX 9.
February 2024	FAA Administrator Mike Whitaker directed Boeing to develop a comprehensive action plan to set a new standard for safety and how the company does business. This roadmap is necessary to reset the safety culture at Boeing, as well as address the findings of the FAA's special audit and the expert review panel report. Whitaker directed Boeing to submit the plan in late May.
May 2024	Received Boeing's corrective action plan.: The FAA required Boeing's plan to include a detailed update on completed actions as well as mid- and long-term actions Boeing will take. These actions include: Strengthening its Safety Management System, including employee safety reporting; Simplifying processes and procedures and clarifying work instructions; Enhanced supplier oversight; Enhanced employee training and communication; Increased internal audits of production system; Additionally, Boeing had to identify the results of completed actions and how it will monitor those and future actions to validate progress and sustain the changes
Ongoing	To ensure long-term success, the FAA is actively monitoring Boeing's progress in a variety of ways, including: A team of FAA subject matter experts continually review Boeing's progress and the effectiveness of the changes in addressing the audit findings and expert panel recommendations; Senior FAA leaders meet with Boeing weekly to review their performance metrics, progress, and any challenges they're facing in implementing the changes; They also conduct monthly reviews to gauge Boeing's progress; The FAA also continues to issue airworthiness certificates for every newly produced Boeing 737 MAX, even the defective ones.

== Aircraft each airlines had (Boeing 737 MAX 9 before Alaska Airlines flight 1282) ==
Airline	How much aircraft	Status after Alaska airlines 1282
United Airlines	79	all grounded
Alaska Airlines	65	all grounded
