= Ethiopian Civil Aviation Authority =

Ethiopian government agency

Agency overview
- Formed: 2002
- Type: Governmental
- Jurisdiction: Ethiopian government
- Headquarters: Bole, Addis Ababa, Ethiopia; 8.986216°N 38.793922°E
- Annual budget: 143.4 million birr (2012)
- Agency executive: Getachew Mengiste, Director-General
- Parent department: Ministry of Transport and Communications
- Website: www.ecaa.gov.et

The Ethiopian Civil Aviation Authority (ECAA, Amharic: የኢትዮጵያ ሲቪል ኤቪዬሽን ባለሥልጣን) is an agency of the Ministry of Transport and Communications of the Government of Ethiopia. It was established under Proclamation No. 273/2002.

The Ethiopian Civil Aviation Accident Prevention and Investigation Bureau conducts aircraft accident investigations in Ethiopia or involving Ethiopian aircraft. The Flight Safety Department of the Ethiopian CAA conducted aircraft accident investigations in Ethiopia and/or involving Ethiopian aircraft.

== History ==
Ethiopia was one of the few African countries present at the Chicago Conference in December 1944 and to participate in the creation of the International Civil Aviation Organization. Ethiopian Airlines was soon after established in 1945 and operated just 6 DC-3s.
