= Financial impact of the Boeing 737 MAX groundings =

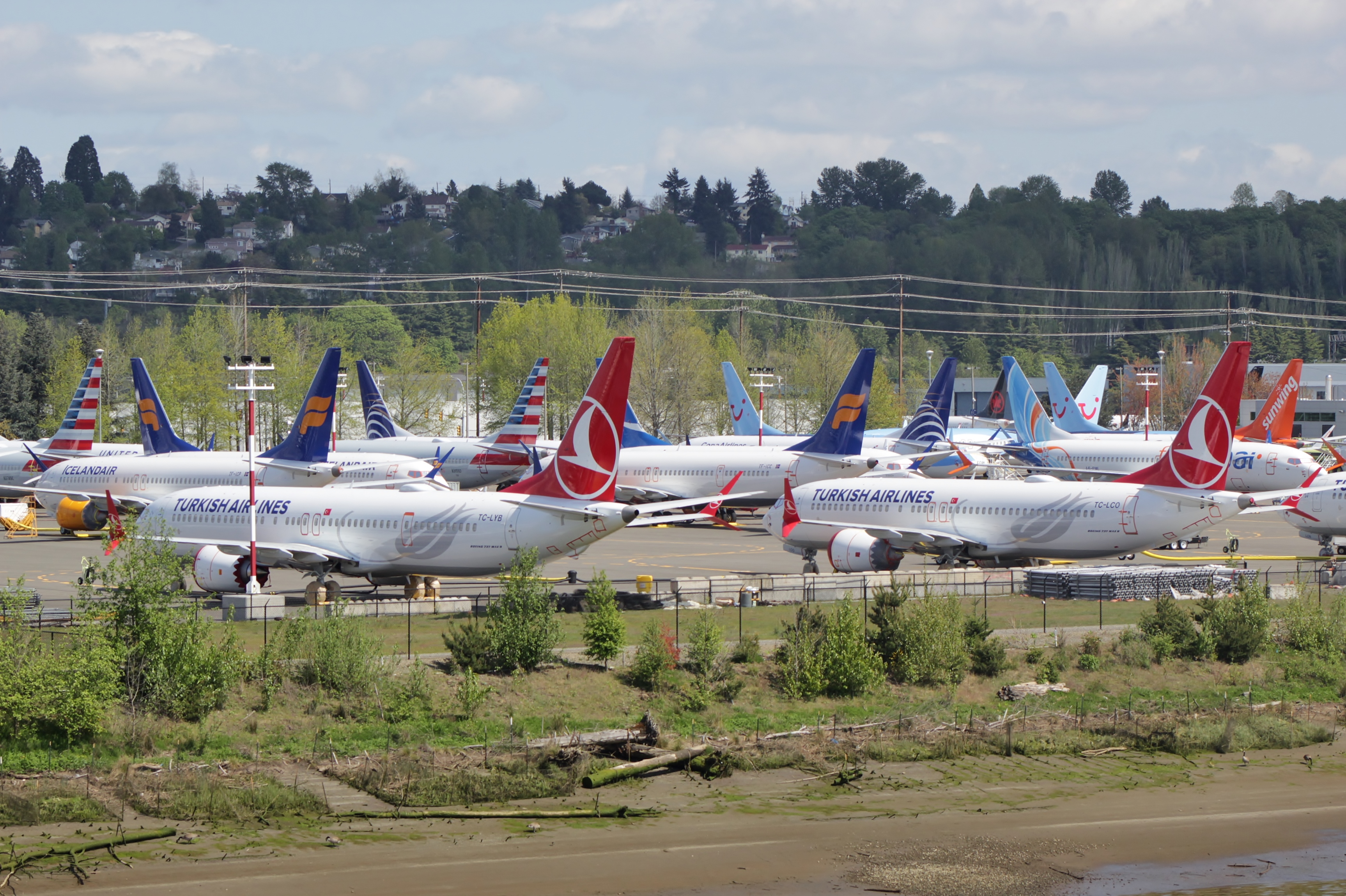
A parking lot at Boeing Field in Seattle filled with grounded Boeing 737 MAX aircraft

The Boeing 737 MAX groundings had a deep financial effect on the aviation industry and a significant effect on the national economy of the United States. No airline took delivery of the MAX during the groundings. A grounding of the 737 MAX 8 lasted between 13 March 2019 and 18 November 2020 and a shorter grounding for the 737 MAX 9 between 6 January 2024 and 25 January 2024. Boeing slowed MAX production to 42 aircraft per month until January 2020, when they halted until the aircraft was reapproved by regulators. Boeing has suffered directly through increased costs, loss of sales and revenue, loss of reputation, victims litigation, client compensation, decreased credit rating and lowered stock value. In January 2020, the company estimated a loss of $18.4 billion for 2019, and it reported 183 canceled MAX orders for the year.

In February 2020, the global COVID-19 pandemic and the resulting travel bans created further uncertainty for Boeing. In March 2020, news that Boeing was seeking a $60 billion bailout caused a steep drop in its stock price, though Boeing eventually received $17 billion in funds from the coronavirus stimulus. Its extensive supply chain providing aircraft components and flight simulators suffered similar losses, as did the aircraft services industry, including crew training, the aftermarket and the aviation insurance industry. At the time of the recertification by the FAA in November 2020, Boeing's net orders for the 737 MAX were down by more than 1,000 aircraft, 448 orders canceled and 782 orders removed from the backlog because they are no longer certain enough to rely on; the total estimated direct costs of the MAX groundings were US$20 billion and indirect costs over US$60 billion. On January 7, 2021, Boeing settled to pay over $2.5 billion after being charged with fraud.

== Effect on Boeing ==
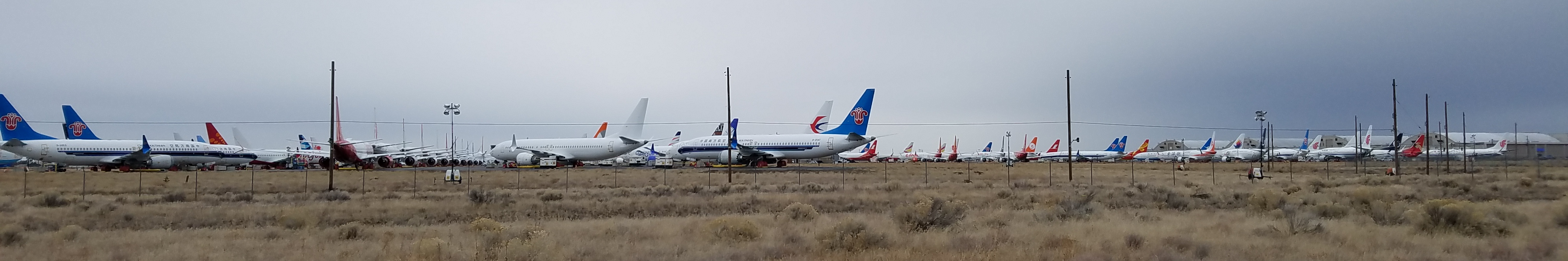
737 MAX aircraft parked at Grant County International Airport in October 2019

Following its intention to suspend production in December 2019, Boeing estimated an additional cost of $6.3 billion to deliver the 737 MAX program and a subsequent reduction in the program's anticipated profit margin.

Boeing initially hoped that flights would resume by July 2019, but on June 3, CEO Dennis Muilenburg revised this to the end of 2019, with no firm timeline. On July 18, Boeing reaffirmed a return to flight during the fourth quarter of 2019, but noting that the date could still slip. In September 2019, Muilenburg suggested a phased return around the world because of the regulatory divisions regarding recertification. Later that same month Boeing told its suppliers that the plane could return to service by November. On November 11, 2019, Boeing revised this to a resumption of deliveries in December 2019 and commercial flights in January 2020. In January 2020, Boeing said it was not expecting recertification until mid 2020.

In the second quarter of 2019, Boeing reported a record quarterly loss of $2.9 billion, as it provisioned $4.9 billion for airlines compensation. Its inventory had grown by $6 billion, its stock market value had dropped by $62 billion and its share price lost 25% between March and August 2019. Including the knock-on cost for airlines and the supply chain, the groundings were costing $4 billion per quarter. At the time of the grounding, Boeing's annual revenue was $100 billion, 60% of which came from sales of airliners. The 737 MAX represented a third of sales to airlines. The company had a 10% profit margin, for an annual profit of $10 billion. It employed 137,000 people in the United States and paid $45 billion to 13,600 domestic suppliers, which employed a further 1.3 million people, accounting for about 1% of the American workforce. In the first quarter of 2020, Boeing is seeking financial bailout of $60-billion against further disruptions caused by the global coronavirus pandemic.

A special board meeting on October 20, 2019, discussed the financial effect of the groundings, amid speculation of possible staff reductions. Staff in the US and the UK were not to receive their 2019 Christmas bonuses. New CEO Dave Calhoun will receive a multimillion-dollar bonus if he achieves a key milestone of returning the MAX to service.

Development of the Boeing New Midsize Airplane has been postponed to prioritize resources on returning the MAX to service. In July 2019, Boeing desisted from a $60 billion Pentagon procurement to replace land-based nuclear missiles. Dow Jones Newswires reported that "some analysts" said that Boeing's ability to pursue big military projects is reduced because of the financial cost of the groundings. As of November 2020, banks valued Boeing's direct costs at 20 billion, and indirect costs of over 60 billion dollars (1200 aircraft) in lost sales, which may be recovered in the future at concessionary prices.

On January 7, 2021, Boeing settled to pay over $2.5 billion after being charged with fraud over the company's hiding of information from safety regulators: a criminal monetary penalty of $243.6 million, $1.77 billion of damages to airline customers, and a $500 million crash-victim beneficiaries fund.

=== 737 MAX 9 grounding ===
On January 6, 2024, Alaska Airlines flight 1282, a 737 MAX 9, experienced a rapid decompression after a door plug blew out shortly after takeoff from Portland International Airport. The same day, the FAA grounded 171 MAX 9 aircraft in service at the time. Boeing also temporarily halted the production of the MAX jets.

FAA administrator Mike Whitaker directed Boeing to set new safety standards, which led to an increase of on-site safety inspectors in Boeing's Washington facility and at Spirit AeroSystems, the company which manufactured the emergency exit doors for the MAX series.

The FAA conducted an inspection and discovered non-compliance issues in Boeing's manufacturing process control, parts handling and storage, and product control. The investigation is currently ongoing.

=== Litigation ===
==== Pilots ====
In June 2019, 737 MAX pilots jointly filed a class action against Boeing for lost wages due to the grounding, claiming that Boeing attempted to cover-up design flaws with the aircraft.

On October 7, 2019, Southwest Airlines Pilots Association filed a suit against Boeing, arguing it misled the airline's labor union. The association said the MAX grounding cost its pilots over $100 million in lost income, which it claims Boeing should pay.

==== Victims' families ====
Bereaved families of the Lion Air crash are in settlement talks with Boeing, while the Ethiopian victims' families are pursuing a jury trial. Boeing, a Chicago-based company, is the target of over 100 cases in U.S. District Court in Chicago. In October 2019, the company hired Dan K. Webb, co-executive chairman of the Winston & Strawn law firm; he will work with a team of attorneys on the lawsuits filed on behalf of the victims of both accidents.

Unlike the maximum claim by a passenger against an airline, which is limited by the Montreal Convention, claims against the manufacturer are not subject to a preset limit. In effect since 1999, the convention requires an airline, regardless of fault, if it is based in a country that ratified the treaty, to pay around $170,000 each as a minimum liability.

Representatives of passengers on Ethiopian Airlines Flight 302 may be able to argue that Boeing knew, or should have known or contemplated, the risk of a crash from knowledge of MCAS and previous issues, including the earlier Lion Air crash, potentially opening a route to punitive damages. According to lawyers involved in passenger claims, the U.S. legal structure for damage claims is often plaintiff-friendly, and Boeing may therefore attempt to argue that claims on behalf of deceased passengers should be heard in other countries.

On July 3, 2019, Boeing announced it would set aside $100 million to help families of victims with education, hardship and living expenses and for community programs and economic development. However, the plan was criticized by several families, calling it "too vague" and citing that Boeing did not consult them ahead of time. Boeing initially did not explain how it would allocate the money. Boeing later announced it dedicates half to distribute to families of victims, under the oversight of veteran U.S. compensation expert Ken Feinberg. The remainder is reserved for government and community projects. Boeing said that the fund distributions are independent from the outcome of lawsuits.

On September 25, 2019, Boeing began to settle the first lawsuits with families of the Lion Air crash victims. It has been reported that each of the settlements cost $1.2 million.

On October 30, during congressional hearings, Boeing's CEO was destabilized when lawmakers grilled him about Boeing's attempt to move legal cases from the Lion Air accident out of the US. Peter DeFazio (D) Oregon, the chair of the committee, starkly asked Muilenburg how, as the CEO, he could not be aware of the company's legal strategy.

On January 7, 2021, Boeing settled to establish a $500 million crash-victim beneficiaries fund.

=== Orders and deliveries ===
At the time of the grounding, Boeing had 4,636 unfilled orders worldwide for the 737 MAX valued at an estimated $600 billion. Analysts estimated that each month of the grounding delayed $1.8 billion in revenue to the company. Boeing responded to the market pressures by making massive concessions to customers.

Several airlines have cancelled or announced an intention to cancel orders:

Date	Customer	Orders	Note
2019-03-11	Lion Air	200 (US$22 billion)	In favor of Airbus aircraft.
2019-03-22	Garuda Indonesia	49	"Passengers have lost trust."
2019-04	Jet Airways	119 out of 200	Suspended operations, remain as contractual agreements.
2019-04	Virgin Australia	15	Deferred by almost two years until satisfied with the MAX safety.
2019-06-03	Azerbaijan Airlines	10 MAX 8s	Planned to postpone.
2019-07-07	flyadeal (Saudi Arabia)	30 MAX 8s ($6bn)	Suspended, planning switch to the A320neo family.
2019-07-29	Turkish Airlines	63 (54 MAX 8s + 9 MAX 9s)	Considering switching to the A320neo.
2019-07-31	China Southern Airlines	64 MAX 8s	Suspended orders scheduled to join the 26 MAXs already in its fleet.
2019-08-27	Rostec's subsidiary Avia (Russia)	35	Filed a US lawsuit to cancel the order.
2019-10	Royal Air Maroc	2	Suspended.
2020-01-15	Malaysia Airlines	25	Suspended delivery.
2020-01	Norwegian Air International	14	Postponed delivery.

However, Turkish airline SunExpress and an unnamed airline ordered 30 MAXs at the Dubai Airshow in November 2019.

Boeing lost 45 orders for the MAX, following cancellations and conversions, through the first 10 months of 2019.

On January 14, 2020, Boeing reported a net loss of 87 aircraft orders in 2019, its worst performance in three decades; airline customers had canceled 183 orders for the MAX, while Boeing received only 96 orders for other aircraft.

In April 2020, analysts expected a wave of cancellations after the global coronavirus pandemic resulted in steep reduction of passenger air travel. Airlines and lessors may decide to cancel MAX orders without penalty due to contract provisions enabled by the aircraft's prolonged grounding.

As of the end of July 2020, Boeing's order book for the 737 MAX had been reduced by 836 aircraft since the beginning of the year, for a total firm order backlog of 4,496 aircraft, compared to 7,539 for the Airbus A320neo family.

=== Revenue and earnings ===
On April 24, 2019, Boeing released its first-quarter results. The company announced that the grounding of the 737 MAX would cost as much as $1 billion. It consequently suspended its stock buyback program and announced that the previously released earnings forecasts, which were compiled prior to the grounding, were no longer valid and new forecasts will be released in the future. Boeing also blamed the grounding for a 21% drop in quarterly profits relative to the quarterly profits from the previous year.

On July 18, 2019, Boeing announced that it was to take a $4.9 billion after-tax charge in the second quarter of 2019. This corresponds to its initial estimate of the cost of compensation to airlines, but not the cost of lawsuits, potential fines, or the less tangible cost to its reputation. It also said that its estimated production costs would rise by $1.7 billion, primarily due to higher costs associated with the reduced production rate.

On July 24, 2019, Boeing released its second-quarter results. The company reported a $2.9 billion loss due to the groundings. It also warned that production might need to be reduced or even suspended if the groundings last longer than Boeing's current assumptions of a return to service in the fourth quarter of 2019. Boeing said that the total cost of groundings approached $8 billion as of July 2019.

In September 2019, Ryanair froze payments to Boeing and started talks on recouping costs of the delay.

According to an earnings report on October 23, in the third quarter of 2019, the grounding cost was $900 million, adding up to $9.2 billion to date for Boeing.

According to George Ferguson, Senior Aerospace, Defense & Airlines Analyst for Bloomberg Intelligence, Boeing would incur an estimated $5 billion if pilots need to be trained on simulator before flying the MAX.

In January 2020, Boeing was said to be securing a loan of $10 billion or more to face rising costs due to the MAX crisis. Presenting its 2019 financial results, Boeing doubled its projection to $18.4 Bn after another $9.2 Bn in losses: a $2.6 Bn write-off, $2.6 Bn for lower 737 production, and $4 Bn as an account book loss.

Due to the crisis, Airbus displaced Boeing as the largest aerospace company by revenue in 2019, with revenues of $78.9 billion and $76 billion respectively. Boeing recorded $2 billion operating losses, down from $12 billion profits the previous year.

=== Stock analysis ===
On March 10, 2019 and in the days following the crash of Ethiopian Airlines Flight 302, Boeing's stock price declined. By March 14, the stock had lost 11% of its value. By March 23, 2019, the stock had lost 18% of its value, which represented a $40 billion drop in market capitalization.

On April 8, 2019, Bank of America downgraded Boeing's stock after production of the 737 MAX was reduced. On April 10, 2019, a class action lawsuit was filed against Boeing in the U.S. District Court for the Northern District of Illinois by a shareholder who accused the company of "covering up safety problems with its 737 MAX".

On May 7, 2019, Barclays downgraded Boeing stock after conducting a passenger survey that showed nearly half those polled would not fly on the airplane for a year or more after it returns to service.

On July 22, 2019, Fitch Ratings and Moody's lowered Boeing's outlooks to negative from stable, in light of the 737 MAX situation.

On October 21, 2019, Wall Street analysts downgraded Boeing's stock; Boeing's market value could drop by $53 billion according to UBS and Credit Suisse.

On November 11, 2019, Boeing stock rose 4.7% on positive 737 MAX news that it was hoping to resume deliveries of the 737 MAX aircraft to airlines in December 2019 and providing more detail on how the 737 MAX will return to service in January 2020.

On December 18, Moody's downgraded Boeing by one level to A3, noting the uncertainty of when the MAX will return to service.

In January 2020, Ron Epstein, aerospace analyst at Bank of America Merrill Lynch, estimates that groundings cost, excluding any settlements from lawsuits from crash victims' families, could reach $20 billion, provided the MAX returns by June or July, 2020.

In January 2020, Fitch Ratings lowered Boeing's long-term credit rating from A to A−, due to risks of delays in returning the MAX to service.

As of March 2020, due to the COVID-19 recession, Boeing's stock had fallen to $129, a 71% deep drop from its March 2019 peak of $446 in the days before the Ethiopian Airlines Flight 302 crash.

=== Coronavirus relief ===
In March 2020, the grounding, compounded by the COVID-19 pandemic had already lowered Boeing's stock price to under $100. Boeing was seeking a $60 billion bailout directed towards its aerospace suppliers. Under the too big to fail theory, Boeing is a significant production and employment contributor to the U.S. economy. On March 25, the United States Senate began voting on its coronavirus aid and relief, which includes $17 billion in aid to Boeing.

== Boeing suppliers ==
The reduced production rate and later suspension has caused major disruption throughout Boeing's supply chain of around 8,000 companies.

Spirit AeroSystems, the fuselage supplier for the 737 MAX, saw margins slip and cut work time while it lost 28% of its market capitalization ($3 billion) since March; the 737 MAX accounted for half of the company's revenues. Composite materials supplier Allegheny Technologies was similarly hit, but others like United Technologies (UTC) or Senior plc were more insulated. Spirit suspended production on January 1, 2020. By the end of January, Spirit and Boeing reached a deal to build 216 fuselage sections for the year 2020, or about 18 per month. Spirit did not expect Boeing to resume full pace of 52 aircraft monthly until 2022.

General Electric and Safran Aircraft Engine jointly own CFM International, which builds the engines for the 737 MAX. As of September 2019, Safran expected to see the groundings affect its finances in the second half of 2019. The "decrease of pre-payments for future deliveries" was expected to reduce free cash flow in each semester by €300 million (354 million USD). In October 2019, General Electric reported a $1.4 billion loss due to delayed sales of the CFM LEAP engines for the 737 MAX. In January 2020, General Electric shifted production output to favor the LEAP variant used on the A320neo, but stated that it is prepared to meet demand from both Boeing and Airbus. In January 2020 GE's factory in Bromont, Quebec, cut 13% of its workforce due to the MAX production halt and uncertainty about the restart date.

In January 2020, United Technologies expected Boeing's production shutdown to last around 90 days, and forecast that production would then resume a rate of 21 aircraft per month, down from 42 prior to the shutdown. It expected the suspension to cost it around $300 million in lost revenue and $150 million in operating profit for the quarter; lost revenue for the full year will total some $600 million.

A company based in Florida, XTRA Aerospace Inc., had worked on the 737 MAX AoA sensor of the Lion Air accident. The FAA began investigating XTRA in November 2018, shortly after the Indonesia crash, and revoked Xtra Aerospace's repair station certificate on October 25, because the company had "failed to comply with requirements to repair only aircraft parts on its list of parts acceptable to the FAA that it was capable of repairing."

== Airlines ==
On March 13, 2019, Norwegian became the first airline to publicly demand compensation from Boeing for the costs of the groundings of the 737 MAX. CEO Bjørn Kjos said, "It is quite obvious we will not take the cost related to the new aircraft that we have to park temporarily, we will send this bill to those who produce this aircraft." India's SpiceJet also announced that they will seek compensation from Boeing. A senior official said, "We will seek compensation from Boeing for the grounding of the aircraft. We will also seek recompense for revenue loss and any kind of maintenance or technical overhaul that the aircraft will have to undergo. This is part of the contract, which we signed with Boeing for all the 737 MAX aircraft." On April 10 state-owned China Eastern Airlines requested compensation from Boeing over the disruptions.

Airlines have countered the capacity loss by extending leases, deferring maintenance, rearranging aircraft assignments and canceling flights; most had removed the 737 MAX from schedules. On May 22, Bloomberg L.P. estimated Boeing's reimbursements will approach $1.4 billion based on typical operating profit per aircraft, would not be allocated until "expected deliveries are made" and compensation can include order changes. Chinese carriers estimated the cost of the grounding at CNY4 billion ($579 million) by the end of June. The delivery delay will cost Ryanair about a million passengers through the summer of 2019, but the low-cost carrier remains confident in Boeing and would prefer better pricing on future orders rather than cash compensation.

Southwest Airlines, the largest operator of the type with 34 MAXs and a further 262 on order, canceled thousands of flights and said the aircraft had a financial impact of $435 million for the first three quarters of 2019. In December 2019, Southwest reached an initial agreement with Boeing. The compensation terms remained confidential, though $125 million of the amount is to be shared with the airline's employees via incremental profit sharing. Factoring in aircraft retirement and renewal, Southwest operated with 60 less aircraft than expected.

American Airlines canceled 115 flights a day, lowering estimated full-year pretax revenue by $350 million.

Brazil's Gol expected to spend respectively 1% and 2% more than planned on fuel in the third and fourth quarters of 2019, according to its chief financial officer.

Globally, Official Airline Guide (OAG) estimates that the grounding will cost airlines $4 billion of sales by November.

By July 2019, United Airlines purchased 19 used 737-700s to fill in for MAX aircraft, to be delivered in December 2019. United had expected to receive 30 MAX aircraft by the end of 2019 and a further 28 in 2020.

In October, American Airlines CEO Doug Parker said during a media interview: "Certainly the shareholder piece should be borne by the Boeing shareholders, not the American Airlines shareholders."

On January 14, 2020, American Airlines cancelled its MAX flights until June 3. On January 16, Southwest Airlines removed the MAX from its schedule until June 6, to allow pilots to spend time in simulators as newly recommended. On January 22, United Airlines announced that it was not expecting to return the MAX to service until after the peak summer season.

In February 2020, TUI announced that it had chosen to secure replacement capacity for its MAX fleet until the end of the year, and expected the cost of the grounding to reach between €220 and 245 million for the year. Southwest, American and United have deferred MAX flights until August 2020.

On January 7, 2021, Boeing settled to pay $1.77 billion in damages to airline customers.

== Aircraft lessors ==
In December 2019, Air Lease, AerCap and GE Capital Aviation Services, three major aircraft leasing companies, had recorded record sales for months, as the groundings forced many operators to turn to them. In September, an analyst said that "renting a 10-year-old 737 NG, the MAX's predecessor, which consumes 15% more kerosene, cost $300,000 a month compared to $230,000 in January."

Timaero Ireland Limited, a Dublin-based aircraft leasing company was suing Boeing in the US federal court in Chicago, alleging fraud and breach of contract in deals it signed starting in 2014 for 22 of MAX airliners. The company said it relied on Boeing's assurances that the planes were safe and would be delivered on time, but as of December 17, 2019, Boeing had delivered two instead of four aircraft and had refused to refund Timaero's advance payments on the planes. The leasing company demanded at least US$185 million in damages, citing design flaws that led to two deadly crashes and the grounding of the aircraft.

Some customers were evaluating whether to revoke lease deals once delay of 737 MAX return to service reaches 12 months, which would result in lower lease rates and depreciation of aircraft value. Some lessors believe Boeing have to compensate the fall in value of the jets. It is reported that some lenders are demanding higher collateral, leading to a lower 'loan-to-value' than a comparable Airbus jet. Boeing also has to convince major aircraft lessors that the 737 MAX remains a sound long-term investment. A crucial concern among financiers is if Boeing would develop a 737 MAX replacement before the typical 15–20 years of production run.

== Training and simulators market ==
The Boeing 737 MAX simulator market is supplied by CAE Inc., L3 Harris Technologies Inc., and Tru Simulation + Training Inc. As of January 2020, there were 34 certified MAX flight simulators worldwide.

CAE supplies 80 per cent of the world market for flight simulators and provides training services. In November 2019, anticipating a high demand for training pilots when the MAX resumes flight, CAE increased production of simulators for the Boeing 737 MAX series. Chief executive Marc Parent said: "Our assumption is that there's obviously going to be a lot of pent-up demand when those airplanes start flying". Increasing production before customer orders is an unusual step in this industry. As of mid-November 2019, the company had received 48 orders and delivered 23 to airlines through December. In India, at the request of DGCA, Boeing placed a simulator managed by CAE to support local training.

== Aviation insurance ==
The insurance payout will likely be the biggest ever, according to S&P Global Ratings. According to director Marc-Philippe Juilliard, the crashes and the groundings of the MAX since March are "worst disaster in the history" of aviation insurance.

The grounding of Boeing's 737 MAX has put pressure on insurance rates. They are likely to rise by more than 10 percent in 2019, even as underwriters try to narrow the insurance contract language about coverage for groundings.

== Effect on the US economy ==
The anticipated effect on the American economy is a reduction of at least half a percentage point (0.5%) in gross domestic product growth for the first quarter of 2020 with economic and employment effects concentrated in supplier locations.

Financial analysts forecast a jet surplus when the MAX returned to service as airlines moved stand-in aircraft back into storage as new aircraft were delivered.
