= Boeing 737 MAX =

Single-aisle airliner family

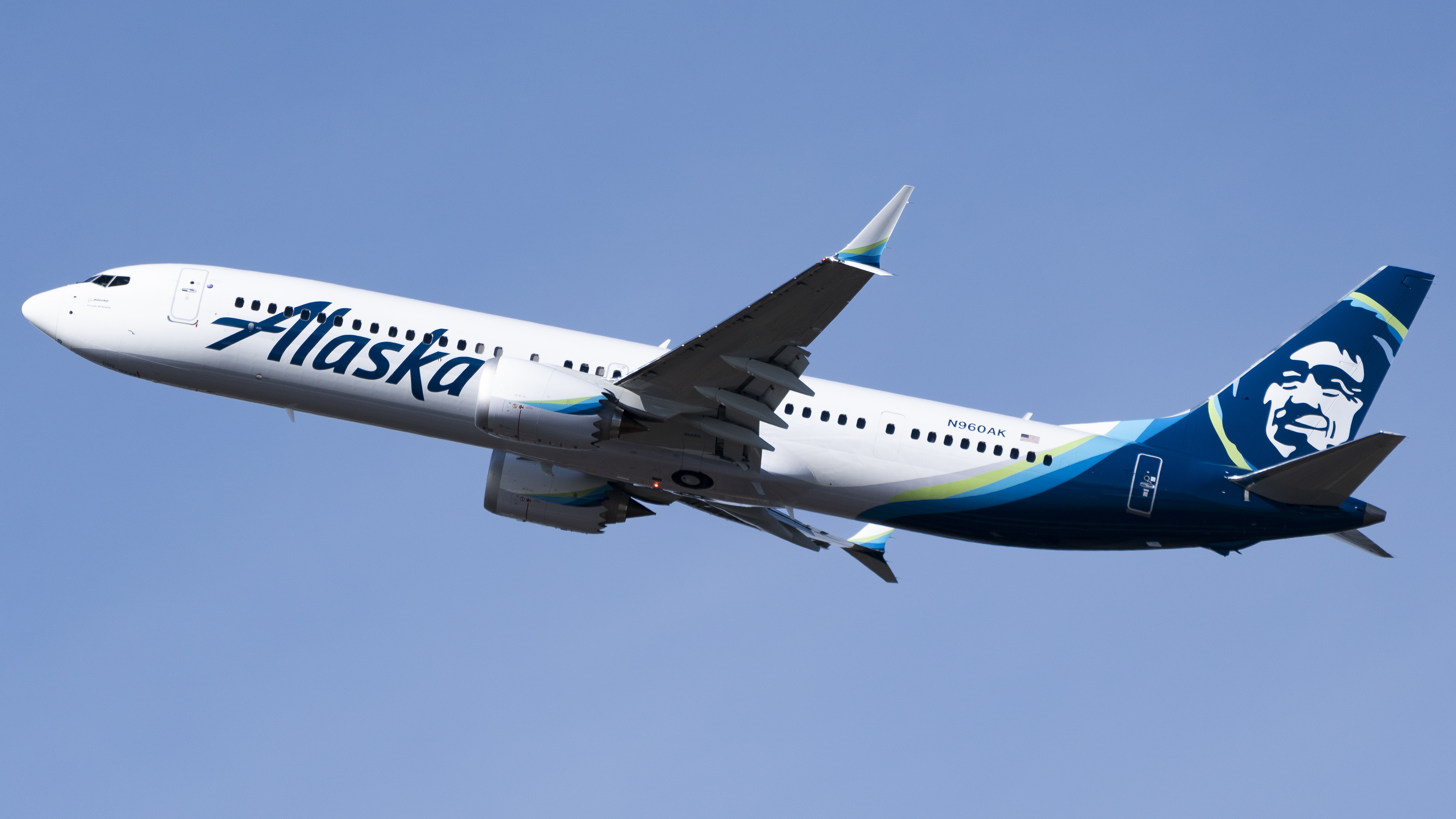
- A 737 MAX 9 of Alaska Airlines in 2023

General information
- Type: Narrow-body airliner
- National origin: United States
- Manufacturer: Boeing Commercial Airplanes
- Status: In service
- Primary users: Southwest Airlines: Ryanair; United Airlines; Alaska Airlines
- Number built: 2,515 as of October 2026

History
- Manufactured: 2014–present (Note: Production halted between January and late May 2020)
- Introduction date: May 22, 2017, with Malindo Air
- First flight: January 29, 2016; 10 years ago
- Developed from: Boeing 737 Next Generation

The Boeing 737 MAX is a series of narrow-body aircraft developed by Boeing Commercial Airplanes as the fourth generation of the Boeing 737. It succeeds the Boeing 737 Next Generation and incorporates more efficient CFM International LEAP engines, aerodynamic improvements such as split-tip winglets, and structural modifications. The program was announced in August 2011, the first flight took place in January 2016, and the aircraft was certified by the U.S. Federal Aviation Administration (FAA) in March 2017. The first delivery, a MAX 8, was made to Malindo Air in May 2017.

The 737 MAX series includes four main variants—the MAX 7, MAX 8, MAX 9, and MAX 10—with increasing fuselage length and seating capacity. Boeing also developed a high-density version, the MAX 200, launched by Ryanair. The aircraft typically seats 138 to 204 passengers in a two-class configuration and has a range of 3,300 to 3,850 nautical miles [nmi] (6,110 to 7,130 km; 3,800 to 4,430 mi). As of October 2026, Boeing has delivered 2,515 aircraft and held orders for 4,985 more. The MAX 8 is the most-ordered variant of the MAX family, while the MAX 10 is the largest variant. The primary competitor to the 737 MAX is the Airbus A320neo family, while the Comac C919 joined the competition in 2023.

Two fatal accidents, Lion Air Flight 610 in October 2018 and Ethiopian Airlines Flight 302 in March 2019, led to the global grounding of the 737 MAX fleet from March 2019 to November 2020. The crashes were linked to the Maneuvering Characteristics Augmentation System (MCAS), which activated erroneously due to faulty angle of attack sensor data. Investigations revealed that Boeing had not adequately disclosed the MCAS to operators and identified shortcomings in the FAA's certification process. The incidents caused significant reputational and financial damage to Boeing, including billions of dollars in legal settlements, fines, and cancelled orders.

Following modifications to the flight control software and revised pilot training protocols, the aircraft was cleared to return to service. By late 2021, most countries had lifted their grounding orders. However, the type came under renewed scrutiny after a January 2024 incident in which a door plug detached mid-flight on Alaska Airlines Flight 1282, causing a rapid decompression. The FAA temporarily grounded affected MAX 9 aircraft, and investigations raised further concerns about production quality and safety practices at Boeing.

== Development ==
=== Background ===
In 2006, Boeing began to consider replacing the 737 with a "clean sheet" design that could follow the Boeing 787 Dreamliner. In June 2010, executives postponed the decision. On December 1, 2010, Boeing competitor Airbus launched the Airbus A320neo family, which offered better fuel economy and operating efficiency than the 737 NG, thanks to its engines: the LEAP from CFM International and the PW1000G from Pratt & Whitney.

In February 2011, Boeing CEO Jim McNerney said, "We're going to do a new airplane." The company had been developing a new aircraft to replace the 737 as part of its Yellowstone Project. In March 2011, Boeing CFO James A. Bell told investors that the company might re-engine the 737, but later that month Boeing Commercial Airplanes President James Albaugh said that the company was not sure about that. The Airbus A320neo gathered 667 commitments at the June 2011 Paris Air Show, bringing its order backlog to 1,029 aircraft, an order record for a new commercial airliner.

On July 20, 2011, American Airlines, which had long bought only Boeing jets, announced an order for 460 narrowbody jets including 130 A320ceo (current engine option), 130 A320neo, and 100 737NG. Officials also said they would order 100 re-engined 737s with CFM LEAP if Boeing pursued the project.

=== Program launch ===
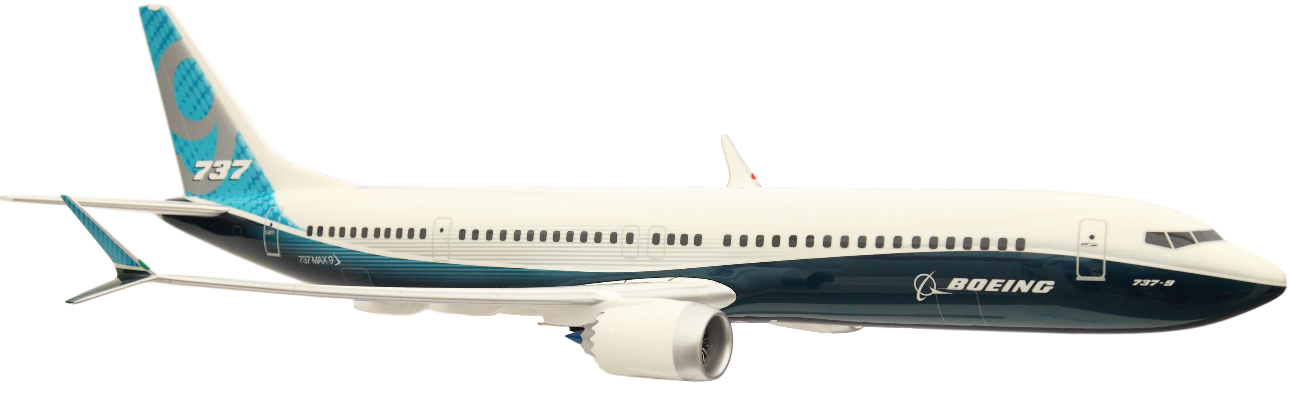
The 737 MAX 9 mockup at the 2012 ILA Berlin

Faced with the record orders for Airbus and the defection of a long-time customer, on August 30, 2011, Boeing's board of directors approved the launch of the re-engined 737 MAX, which they said would meet or exceed the range of the Airbus A320neo while burning 4% less fuel. Studies for additional drag reduction were performed during 2011, including revised tail cone, natural laminar flow engine nacelle, and hybrid laminar flow vertical stabilizer. To focus on the re-engine project, Boeing abandoned the development of a new design under its Yellowstone Project. Firm configuration for the 737 MAX was scheduled for 2013.

In March 2010, the estimated cost to re-engine the 737, according to Mike Bair, Boeing Commercial Airplanes' vice president of business strategy and marketing, would be US$2–3 billion, including the CFM engine development. During Boeing's Q2 2011 earnings call, CFO James Bell said the development cost for the airframe only would be 10–15% of the cost of a new program, which was estimated at US$10–12 billion at the time. Bernstein Research predicted in January 2012, that this cost would be twice that of the A320neo. The MAX development cost could have been well over the internal target of US$2 billion, and closer to US$4 billion. Fuel consumption is reduced by 14% from the 737NG. Southwest Airlines was signed up as the launch customer in 2011.

In November 2014, McNerney said the 737 would be replaced by a new airplane by 2030—probably using composite materials—that would be slightly bigger and have new engines but would retain the 737's general configuration. Boeing talked about developing a clean sheet aircraft to replace the 737. The conceived aircraft was to have a fuselage similar to the 737 though slightly larger, and would make use of the advanced composite technology developed for the 787 Dreamliner. Boeing also considered a parallel development along with the 757 replacement, similar to the development of the 757 and 767 in the 1970s.

=== Production ===
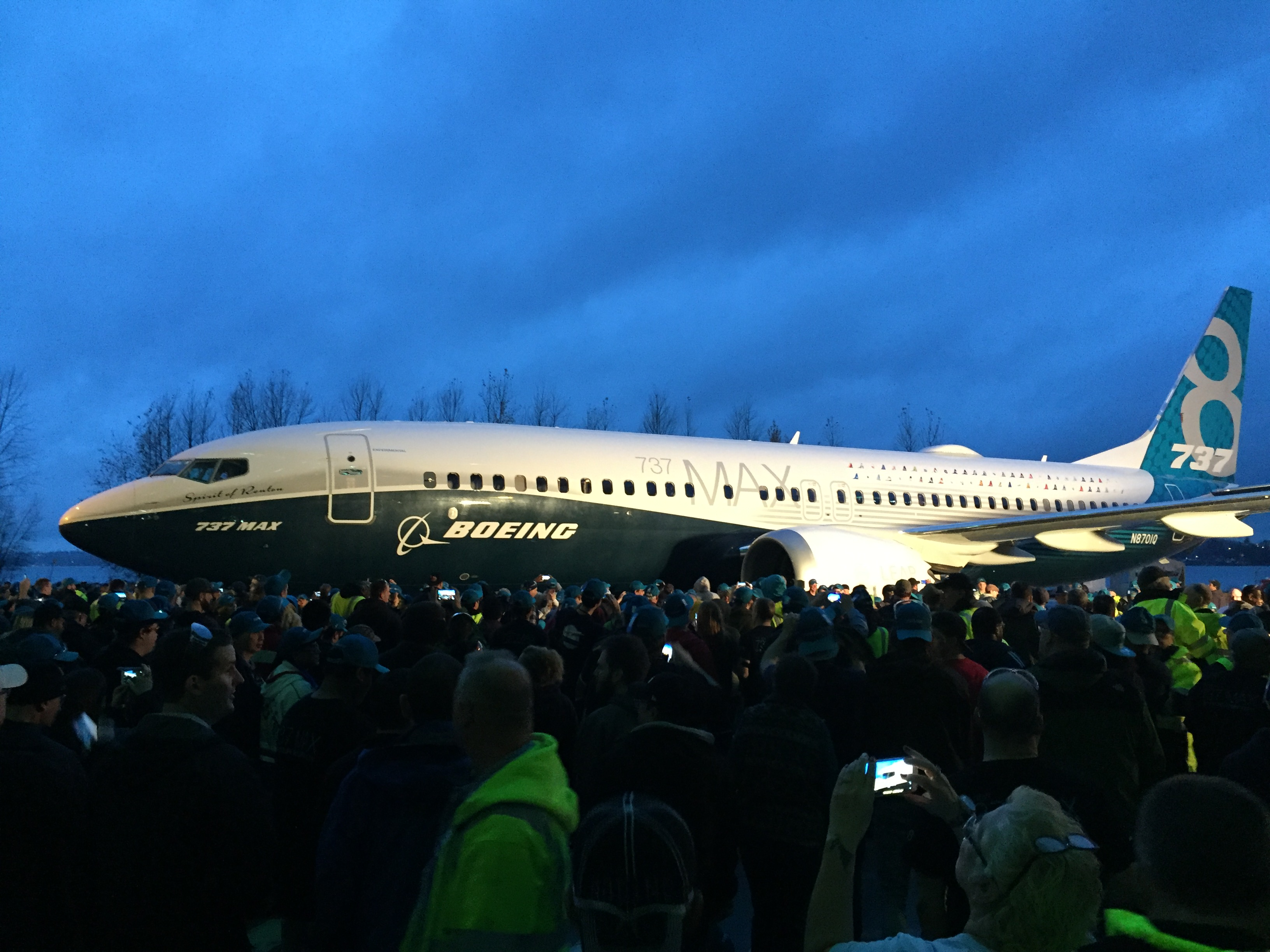
Roll-out of the first Boeing 737 MAX in December 2015

On August 13, 2015, the first 737 MAX fuselage completed assembly at Spirit Aerosystems in Wichita, Kansas, for a test aircraft that would eventually be delivered to launch customer Southwest Airlines. On December 8, 2015, the first 737 MAX—a MAX 8 named Spirit of Renton—was rolled out at the Boeing Renton Factory.

Because GKN could not produce the titanium honeycomb inner walls for the thrust reversers quickly enough, Boeing switched to a composite part produced by Spirit to deliver 47 MAXs per month in 2017. Spirit supplies 69% of the 737 airframe, including the fuselage, thrust reverser, engine pylons, nacelles, and wing leading edges.

A new spar-assembly line with robotic drilling machines was expected to increase throughput by 33%. The Electroimpact automated panel assembly line sped up the wing lower-skin assembly by 35%. Boeing planned to increase its 737 MAX monthly production rate from 42 planes in 2017, to 57 planes by 2019. The new spar-assembly line is designed by Electroimpact. Electroimpact has also installed fully automated riveting machines and tooling to fasten stringers to the wing skin.

The rate increase strained the production and by August 2018, over 40 unfinished jets were parked in Renton, awaiting parts or engine installation, as CFM Leap-1B engines and Spirit fuselages were delivered late. After parked airplanes peaked at 53 at the beginning of September, Boeing reduced this by nine the following month, as deliveries rose to 61 from 29 in July and 48 in August.

On September 23, 2015, Boeing announced a collaboration with Comac (Commercial Aircraft Corporation of China) to build a completion and delivery facility for the 737, in Zhoushan, China, the first outside the United States. This facility initially handles interior finishing only, but will subsequently be expanded to include paintwork. The first aircraft was delivered from the facility to Air China on December 15, 2018.

The largest part of the suppliers cost are the aerostructures at US$10–12 million (35-34% of the US$28.5−35 million total), followed by the engines at US$7−9 million (25-26%), systems and interiors at US$5–6 million each (18-17%), then avionics at US$1.5–2 million (5-6%).

In July 2026, Boeing started assembling 737 MAXs at a new production line at the existing widebody factory in Everett, Washington. This fourth production line is planned to increase total monthly output to 52 planes when it reaches full capacity. The line, formerly used for much larger 787s, has more space than Renton and can produce the largest 737 MAX 10 variant without restrictions, unlike the more space-limited Renton lines, where 737 MAX 10s must be interspersed with smaller 737 MAX 8s to fit on the line.

=== Flight testing and certification ===
The 737 MAX gained its airworthiness approval based on the 737 legacy series (first approved on December 15, 1967), as a Supplemental type certificate (STC), in lieu of a new design approval. The MAX's first flight took place on January 29, 2016, at Renton Municipal Airport, nearly 49 years after the maiden flight of the original 737-100, on April 9, 1967. The first MAX 8, 1A001, was used for aerodynamic trials: flutter testing, stability and control, and takeoff performance-data verification, before it was modified for an operator and delivered. 1A002 was used for performance and engine testing: climb and landing performance, crosswind, noise, cold weather, high altitude, fuel burn and water-ingestion. Aircraft systems including autoland were tested with 1A003. 1A004, with an airliner layout, flew function-and-reliability certification for 300 hours with a light flight-test instrumentation.

The 737 MAX 8 gained FAA certification on March 8, 2017, and in the same month was approved by the European Union Aviation Safety Agency (EASA) on March 27, 2017. After completing 2,000 test flight hours and 180-minute ETOPS testing requiring 3,000 simulated flight cycles in April 2017, CFM International notified Boeing of a possible manufacturing quality issue with low pressure turbine (LPT) discs in LEAP-1B engines. Boeing suspended 737 MAX flights on May 4, and resumed flights on May 12.

During the certification process, the FAA delegated many evaluations to Boeing, allowing the manufacturer to review its own product. It was widely reported that Boeing pushed to expedite approval of the 737 MAX to compete with the Airbus A320neo, which hit the market nine months ahead of Boeing's model.

=== Entry into service ===
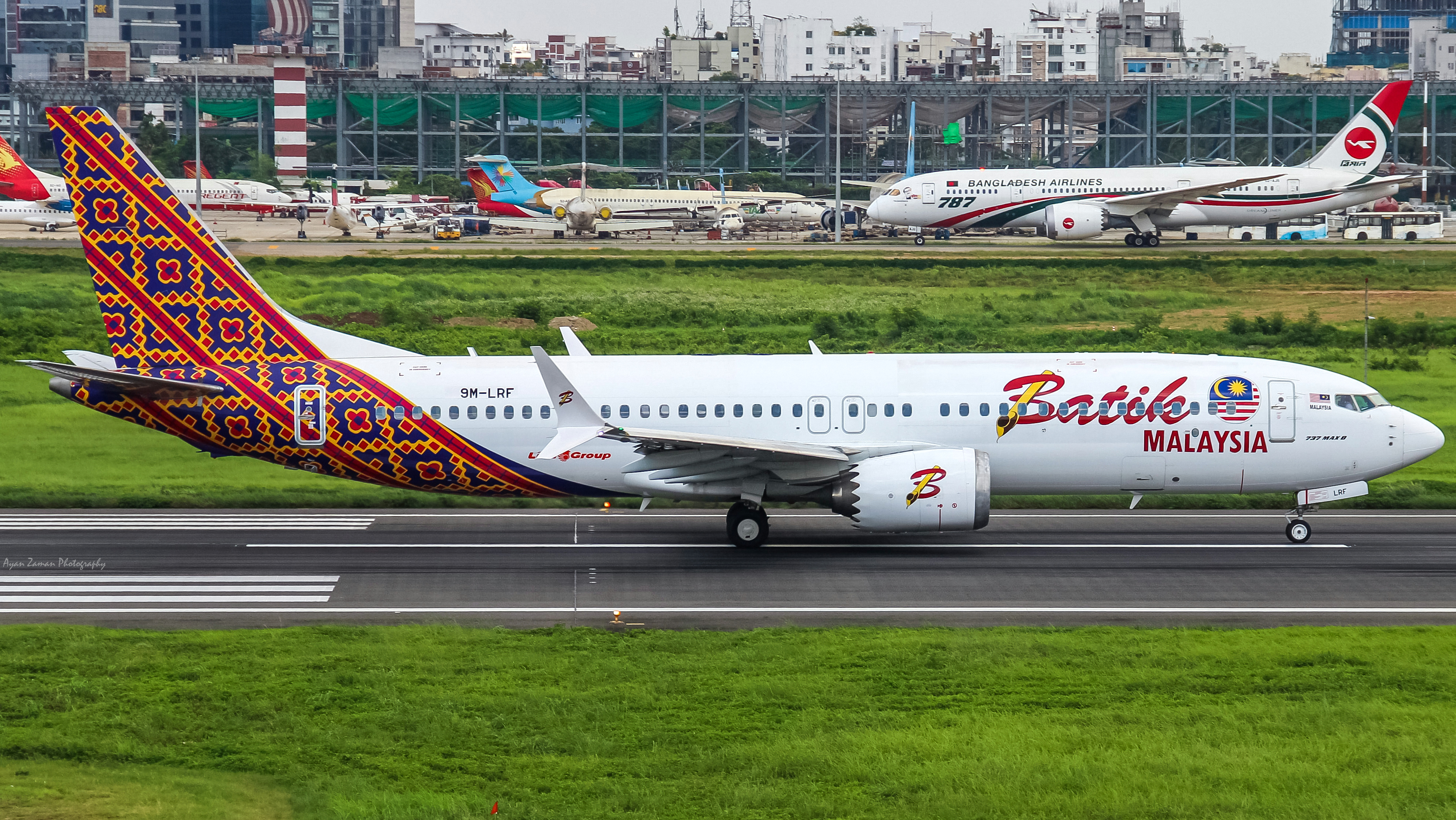
The Boeing 737 MAX 8 entered service with Lion Air's subsidiary Malindo Air (wearing Batik Air Malaysia livery)

The first delivery was a MAX 8 on May 16, 2017, to the then Malindo Air (now Batik Air Malaysia); it entered service on May 22. Norwegian Air International was the second airline to put a 737 MAX into service, when it performed its first transatlantic flight with a MAX 8 named Sir Freddie Laker on July 15, 2017, between Edinburgh Airport in Scotland and Bradley International Airport in the U.S. state of Connecticut.

Boeing aimed for 737 MAX to match the 99.7% dispatch reliability of the 737 Next Generation (NG). Southwest Airlines, the launch customer, took delivery of its first 737 MAX on August 29, 2017. Boeing planned to deliver at least 50 to 75 aircraft in 2017, 10–15% of the more than five hundred 737s to be delivered in the year.

=== Grounding and recertification ===
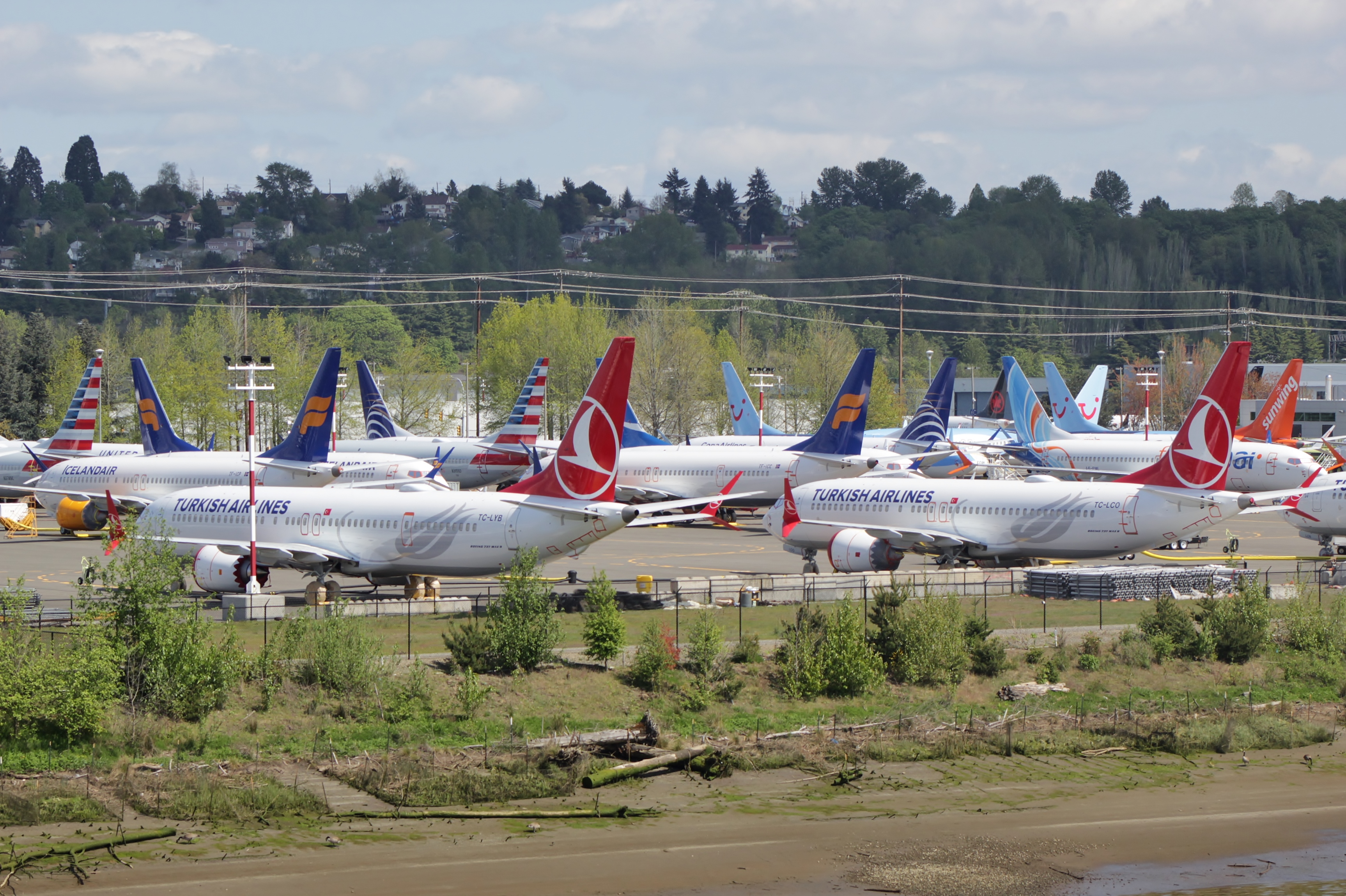
Some of the dozens of undelivered 737 MAX aircraft parked at Boeing Field in Seattle after the type was grounded, 2019

The 737 MAX was grounded after two fatal crashes, Lion Air Flight 610 on October 29, 2018, and Ethiopian Airlines Flight 302 on March 10, 2019, in which a total of 346 people died. The day following the second crash, China became the first air authority to ground the aircraft, followed the next day by Australia, the European Union, India, Malaysia, Singapore, South Korea, and Turkey. The United States Federal Aviation Administration was one of the last to ground the aircraft, defending against groundings by issuing a Continued Airworthiness Notice to operators on March 11, garnering criticism before finally grounding the model on March 13, 2019.

Contributing to the accidents was the Maneuvering Characteristics Augmentation System (MCAS), which activated unexpectedly due to erroneous angle of attack data, and inadequate pilot training. Investigations found Boeing did not fully inform operators about MCAS and found shortcomings in the FAA's certification process for the aircraft.

In the twenty months the aircraft was grounded, Boeing redesigned the computer architecture that supported MCAS. As initially designed, data from just one of the aircraft's two angle-of-attack (AoA) sensors was fed into MCAS. When erroneous data from that sensor was fed into flight computers, it caused repeated uncommanded activation of MCAS, which applied nose-down trim to the horizontal stabilizer. The accident investigations revealed that the AoA sensor on Lion Air Flight }610 was miscalibrated, and the Ethiopian Airlines Flight 302 sensor was likely damaged by a bird strike during takeoff. Boeing was criticized for using data from just one of the two sensors, representing a single point of failure on a flight control system.

Before the crash of Lion Air Flight 610, pilots were not informed by Boeing of the existence of MCAS and were not required to undergo simulator training on the difference between the 737 MAX and earlier 737 versions. Boeing and the FAA would later require simulator training to demonstrate an MCAS activation to pilots.

The final report by the National Transportation Safety Committee of Indonesia into the Lion Air crash criticized Boeing's design and the FAA's certification process for the MCAS flight-control system and said the issues were compounded by maintenance issues and lapses by Lion Air's maintenance crews and its pilots, as well as Xtra Aerospace, a US-based company that supplied Lion Air with a replacement AoA sensor that was likely miscalibrated.

In the crash of Ethiopian Airlines Flight 302, the U.S. National Transportation Safety Board and France's Bureau of Enquiry and Analysis for Civil Aviation Safety identified pilot error and inadequate training by Ethiopian Airlines as critical contributing factors to the crash.

Boeing faced legal and financial consequences, as no deliveries of the MAX could be made while the aircraft was grounded, and airlines canceled more orders than Boeing produced during this period. Boeing found foreign object debris in the fuel tanks of 35 of 50 grounded 737 MAX aircraft that were inspected and had to check the remainder of the 400 undelivered planes. The FAA curtailed Boeing's delegated authority and invited global aviation stakeholders to comment on pending changes to the aircraft and to pilot training. The FAA lifted its grounding order in 2020; all aircraft were repaired to comply with various airworthiness directives.

After being charged with fraud in connection of both crashes of the 737 MAX, Boeing settled by paying over US$2.5 billion in penalties and compensation: a criminal monetary penalty of $243.6 million, $1.77 billion in damages to airline customers, and $500 million to a fund for the families of crash victims.

=== Production slowdown and suspension ===
From mid-April 2019, Boeing announced that it was temporarily cutting production of the 737 aircraft from 52 per month to 42 amid the 737 MAX groundings. Production of the LEAP-1B engine continued at an unchanged rate, enabling CFM to catch up its backlog within a few weeks.

As the 737 MAX recertification moved into 2020, Boeing suspended production from January to conserve funds and prioritize stored aircraft delivery. The 737 MAX program was the company's largest source of profit. Around 80% of the 737 production costs involve payments to parts suppliers, which may be as low as US$10 million per plane. After the announcement, Moody's cut Boeing's debt ratings in December, citing the rising costs due to the grounding and the production halt including financial support to suppliers and compensation to airlines and lessors which could lower the program's margins and cash generation for years. The rating agency also warned that the production halt would have wide and harmful impact to the whole aerospace and defense supply chain and the ramp-up would be slower than previously anticipated. CFM International reduced production of the LEAP-1B for the 737 MAX, in favor of the LEAP-1A for the Airbus A320neo, but was prepared to meet demand for both aircraft.

Boeing did not publicly say how long the suspension would last. The last pre-suspension fuselages entered final assembly in early January 2020. Boeing was reported to internally expect production to be halted for at least 60 days. In early April, the COVID-19 pandemic led Boeing to shut down its other airliner production lines and further delayed recertification of the MAX.

=== Recertification and return to service ===
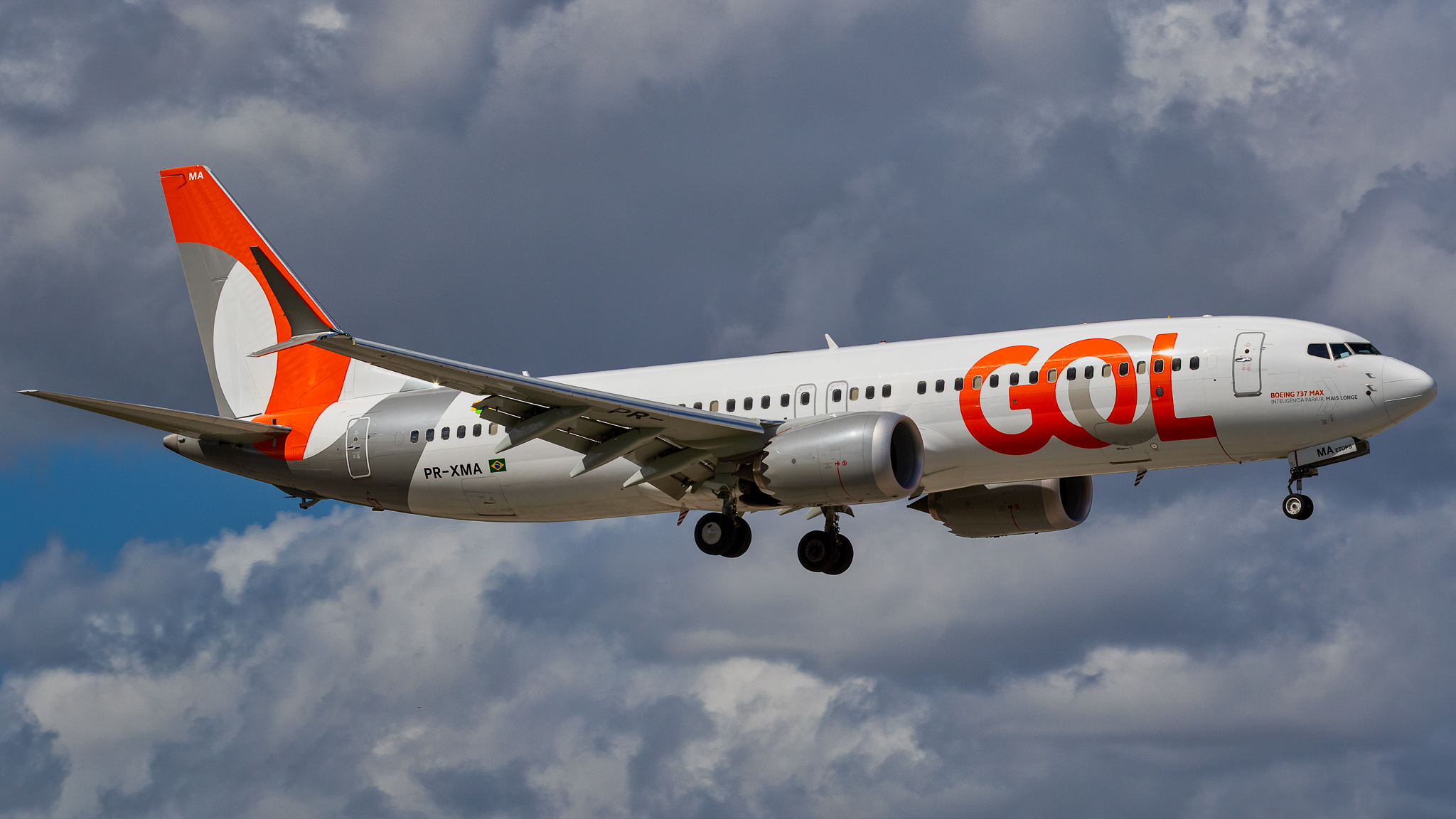
The Brazilian low-cost carrier Gol was the first to resume 737 MAX revenue flight on December 9, 2020

In early January 2020, an issue was discovered in the MAX software update, which impacted its recertification effort. By mid-January, Boeing expected the MAX to return to service by mid-2020. In late April, following the COVID-19 pandemic, Boeing then hoped to win regulatory approval by August 2020. Between June 29 and July 1, the FAA and Boeing conducted a series of recertification test flights. Transport Canada and EASA each concluded their own independent recertification flights in late August and early September. On November 18, the FAA announced that the MAX had been cleared to return to service. Before individual aircraft could resume service, repairs were required as set out in an airworthiness directive from the FAA. Airline training programs also required approval.

On December 3, American Airlines made a demonstration flight for journalists to explain the FAA-required modifications, to regain public trust. The first airline to resume regular passenger service was Brazilian low-cost Gol on December 9. The first in the United States was American Airlines on December 29.

Transport Canada and EASA both cleared the MAX in late January 2021, subject to additional requirements. Other regulators worldwide progressively ungrounded the aircraft, including those in the UAE, Australia, Kenya, and Brazil. The Indian Directorate General of Civil Aviation (DGCA) rescinded its ban on MAX airplanes in late August on the condition that they meet the requirements set by the FAA and EASA. China's civil aviation regulator (CAAC) cleared the 94 jets stored by 11 carriers in China to fly again in December 2021. However, EASA forbade airlines from performing RNP AR approaches with the MAX. In response to the recertification, some booking sites introduced tools allowing travelers to filter results to avoid flying on the type.

=== Production ramp-up and recovery ===
In late January 2020, production was expected to restart in April and take a year and a half to clear the inventory of 400 airplanes, ramping up slowly and building over time: Boeing delivered 180 stored jets by year-end and produced an equal number. Boeing did not disclose any possible effect on deliveries caused by the FAA's withdrawal of Boeing's delegated authority to certify the airworthiness of each aircraft. MAX supplier Spirit AeroSystems said it does not expect to return production rate to 52 per month until late 2022. On May 27, Boeing resumed 737 MAX production at a low production rate finishing the year with 43 total. However the rate was planned to increase towards 31 per month in 2021.

On August 19, Boeing announced that it had received new orders for the 737 MAX for the first time in 2020. Per a statement from the company, Poland's Enter Air SA entered into an agreement to buy up to four 737s. On October 28, Boeing indicated that it expected to deliver about half of the 450 stockpiled aircraft in 2021, and the majority of the remainder in 2022, noting that some of these aircraft will need to be re-marketed and potentially reconfigured. The delivery rate also conditioned the production rate for new aircraft, to avoid compounding the problem. In November, Boeing saw more than 1,000 order cancelations since the grounding in March 2019. Some already-built aircraft had their order canceled, and Boeing began work to find new customers to take delivery.

In 2021, India's Tata Advanced Systems (TASL) joined the 737's supply chain by opening a new production line parallel to the existing production line to produce the fuselage of Boeing AH-64 Apache. On 6 August 2021, TASL announced that they were awarded the contract to supply 737's fan cowls to Boeing and were slated to cater up to 50% of the 737 fan cowl requirement to the latter from FY2025. On 14 February 2023, Tata Boeing Aerospace Limited (TBAL) shipped the first vertical fin structure for the Boeing 737 aircraft. The structures would be delivered to Boeing Renton Factory.

In late January 2022, Boeing's Chief Financial Officer said the 737 program was producing at a rate of 27 aircraft a month and was on track to ramp up the production. On March 4, Boeing reportedly had preliminary plans to ramp up production of the 737 MAX aircraft to about 47 a month by the end of 2023 as the company looked to extend its recovery from successive crises. On July 12, the company said it had met its goal of increasing 737 production to 31 per month when it reported its June order and delivery tally. In September, however, the company noted that it was regularly having to pause production due to component shortages and other supply chain problems.

In late January 2023, Boeing announced that a fourth production line for the 737 MAX would open at the Boeing Everett Factory in Everett, Washington. The line was to replace the discontinued Boeing 787 line at the factory. However, after the January 2024 Alaska Airlines Flight 1282 accident in which a door plug became detached (after not being bolted in place by Boeing) and resulted in an uncontrolled decompression of the aircraft, the FAA announced it would not grant any production expansion of the 737 MAX until it is satisfied that more stringent quality control measures have been enacted. As a result, on May 30, 2024, Boeing announced their Safety & Quality Plan, which outlined actions to strengthen manufacturing quality, safety culture, and regulatory compliance in response to increased oversight by the FAA following the Alaska Airlines Flight 1282 accident.

=== Certification of the MAX 7 and MAX 10 ===
Following the recertification of the MAX 8 and MAX 9, Boeing resumed work to certify the MAX 7 and MAX 10. In March 2022, there were rumors that Boeing would request an exemption from the U.S. Aircraft Safety and Certification Reform Act of 2020, a safety reform law passed in response to the MAX crashes which requires airliners to be fitted with an engine-indicating and crew-alerting system (EICAS) if type certificated after December 31, 2022.

In November 2022, Boeing announced expected delays to the certification of the MAX 7 and MAX 10, then expected in early 2023 and early 2024 respectively. In December, two proposals to exempt the MAX 7 and MAX 10 from the new EICAS requirements were considered for inclusion in a U.S. defense spending bill—one a simple two-year extension to the deadline, the second an exemption for aircraft whose certification applications were submitted before the law was enacted, combined with some equipment changes—but neither proposal was included in the final spending bill.

The U.S. Congress agreed in December 2022 on a bill allowing Boeing to certify the MAX 7 and MAX 10 without EICAS but required that the company must install a third angle-of-attack sensor in all 737 MAX types as previously demanded by European and Canadian regulators. The company also must install a switch to disable the stick shaker, which distracted pilots during the MAX crashes. Boeing would have to retrofit these design changes to all 737 MAXs already delivered in Canada, Europe, and the U.S. within three years of MAX 10 certification.

Boeing requested an additional exemption for the MAX 7 in December 2023. The exemption was related to a problem with the engine anti-ice system Boeing had announced in August 2023 that affected all MAX variants. Boeing had found that if pilots left the engine anti-ice system running after icing was no longer an issue, the system could heat the carbon composite inlet at the front end of the pod surrounding the engine (known as a nacelle) causing it to break and fall off, potentially damaging the engine or fuselage. Boeing said that it was working on a fix for all MAX variants and requested that it be exempted from correcting the MAX 7 before it was allowed to enter service. Boeing withdrew its exemption request in January 2024 after being asked to do so in meetings with the U.S. Congress held after the Alaska Airlines Flight 1282 accident. Boeing completed the anti-ice system redesign in November 2025 and is awaiting approval from the FAA.

The delays have set back the fleet plans of major carriers including Southwest Airlines and United Airlines, the biggest customers for the MAX 7 and MAX 10 respectively. United gave a public rebuke of Boeing saying it was "disappointed" with the company and would no longer include the MAX 10 in its fleet planning, and had a meeting with Airbus to discuss securing more favorable production slots to enable the airline to introduce A321neos more rapidly to cover the delayed MAX 10s.

In January 2025, Boeing requested another time-limited exemption for the MAX 7 and MAX 10's stall management yaw damper (SMYD) system incorporating the required angle-of-attack enhancements, to allow time for certification of the system to a higher design assurance level in line with "increased regulatory expectations".

On August 3, 2026, the FAA certified the 737 MAX 7, issuing an amended type certificate and authorizing production after determining the aircraft met applicable design and safety requirements. Certification followed the incorporation of design changes, including a redesigned engine anti-ice system, and the FAA said it would continue on-site oversight of Boeing's manufacturing.

On October 20, 2026, the FAA certified the 737 MAX 10, issuing an amended type certificate and an updated Production Limitation Record authorizing production. The FAA said the approval followed extensive safety reviews and required improvements to the flight-control system, including an enhanced angle-of-attack sensor. The MAX 10 was the last of the four main 737 MAX variants to receive FAA certification.

== Design ==
In mid-2011, one design objective was matching fuel burn of the 737 MAX to that of the Airbus A320neo's 15% fuel-burn advantage. The initial 737 MAX reduction was 10–12%; it was later enhanced to 14.5%. The fan was widened from 61 inches (150 cm) to 69.4 in (176 cm) by raising the nose gear and placing the engine higher on the wing and further forward. The split tip winglet added 1–1.5% fuel burn reduction and a re-lofted tail cone another 1%. Electronically controlling the bleed air system improved efficiency. The new engine nacelle included chevrons, similar to those of the Boeing 787, which also helped to reduce engine noise.

=== Aerodynamic changes ===
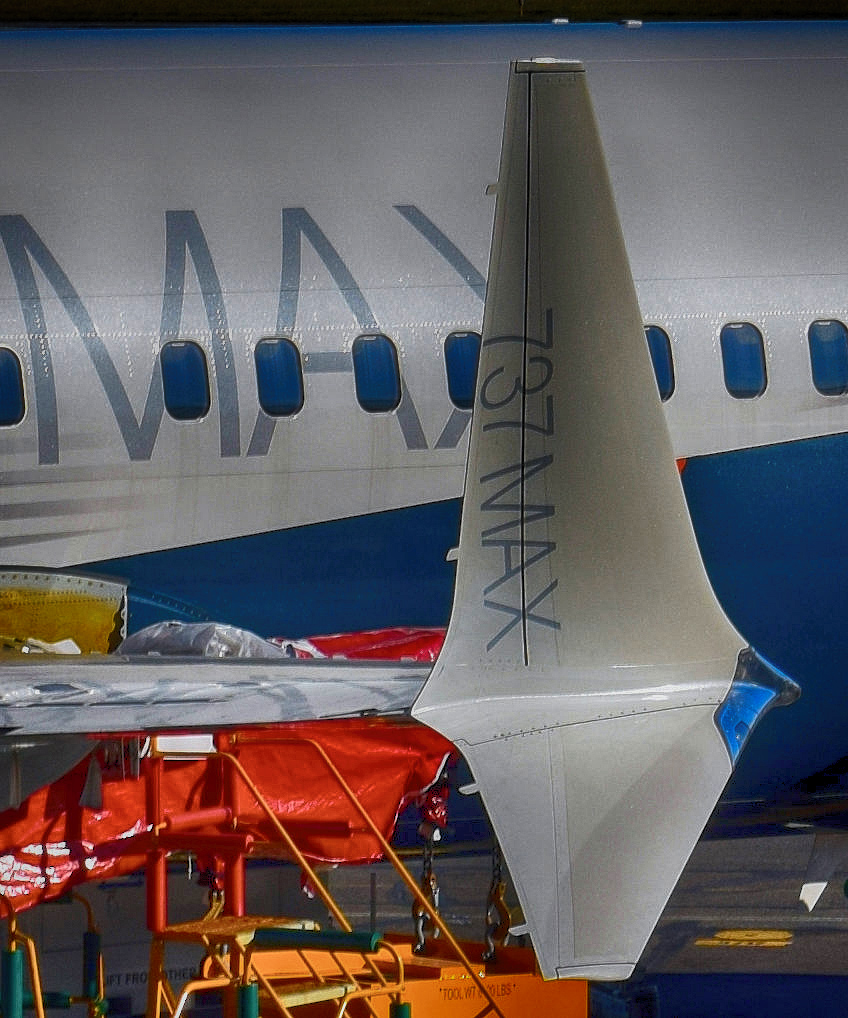
The split-tip winglet on the starboard side of the 737 MAX

The 737 MAX uses a split-tip winglet, designed to reduce vortex drag, which improves fuel efficiency by maximizing lift, while staying in the same ICAO aerodrome reference code letter C gates as current Boeing 737s. It resembles a three-way hybrid of a blended winglet, wingtip fence, and raked wingtip. A split-tip wingtip was first proposed for the McDonnell Douglas MD-12, a 1990s twin-deck aircraft concept. A MAX 8 with 162 passengers on a 3,000-nautical-mile (5,600 km; 3,500 mi) flight is projected to have a 1.8% lower fuel burn than a blended winglet-equipped aircraft (like many 737NG aircraft) and 1% lower over 500 nmi (930 km; 580 mi) at Mach 0.79. The new winglet has a total height of 9 feet 6 inches (2.90 m).

Other improvements include a re-contoured tail cone, revised auxiliary power unit inlet and exhaust, aft body vortex generator removal, and other small aerodynamic improvements.

In order to maintain sufficient engine ground clearance, the 737 MAX uses new engine mounts and pylons. This modified mounting arrangement moves the CFM LEAP engines higher and further forward as compared to the CFM56 engines used on the 737 Classic and 737 NG. The resulting change to the aerodynamic characteristics of the aircraft meant that the handling, feel, and stall recovery of the 737 MAX would have been different from previous models of the 737. Boeing wanted to ensure that pilots could fly the 737 MAX with their existing B737 type rating and minimal conversion training. To counter these differences and maintain the handling that existing 737 pilots are familiar with, Boeing mimicked the characteristics of the previous 737 models by using a software-based flight control law and developing the Maneuvering Characteristics Augmentation System (MCAS).

=== Structural and other changes ===
The 8-inch (20 cm) taller nose-gear strut maintains the same 17-inch (43 cm) ground clearance of previous 737 engine nacelles. New struts and nacelles for the heavier engines add bulk, the main landing gear and supporting structure have been reinforced, and fuselage skins are thicker in some places—thus adding 6,500 pounds (2,900 kg) to the MAX 8's empty aircraft weight. To preserve fuel and payload capacity, its maximum takeoff weight is 7,000 lb (3,200 kg) heavier.

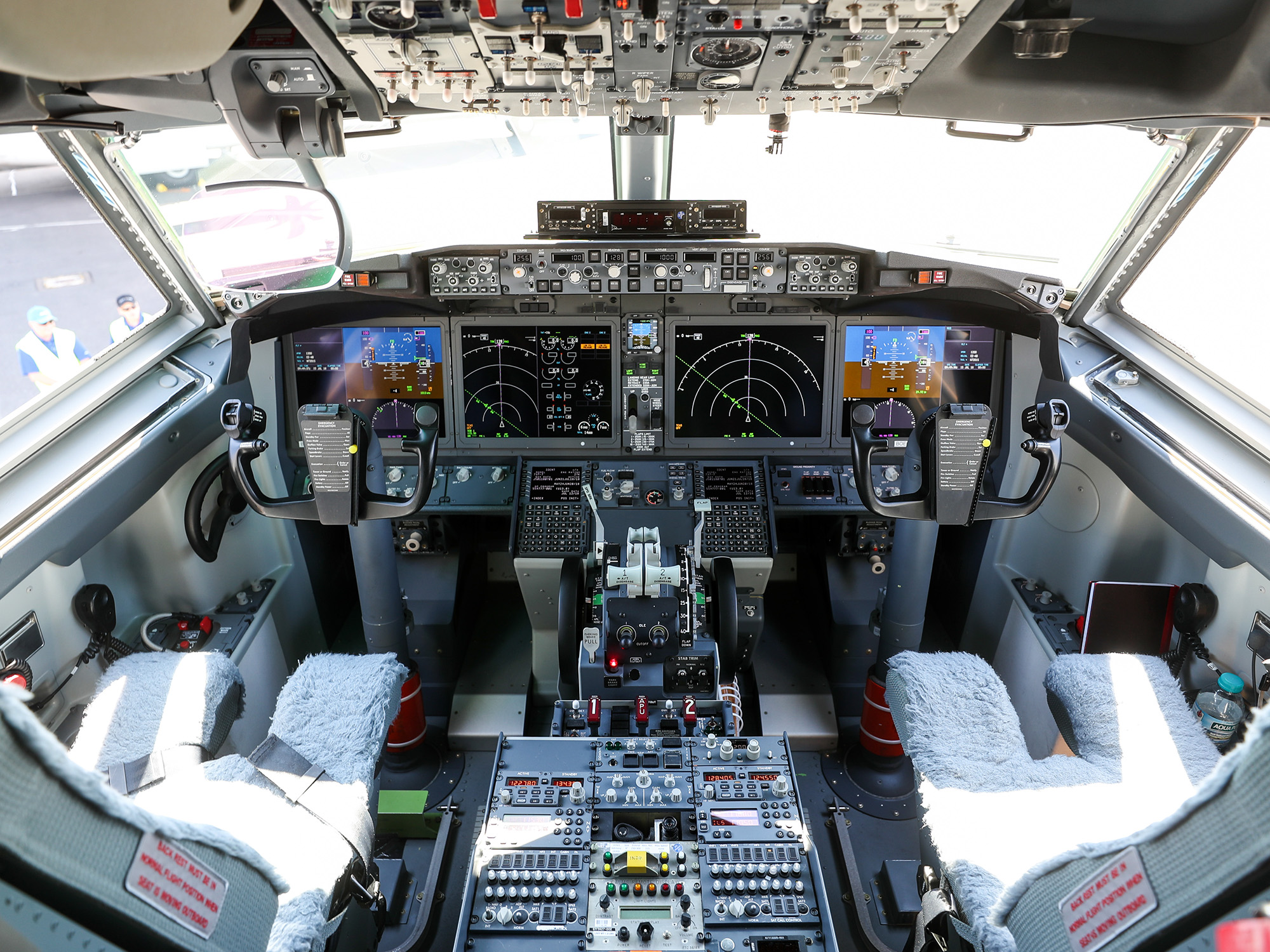
Boeing 737 MAX 8 cockpit. The layout is similar to the 737NG, but the primary flight display is larger, and the navigation display is merged with the multi-function display, eliminating the need for a lower display.

Rockwell Collins was selected to supply four 15.1-inch (380 mm) liquid-crystal displays (LCD), as used on the 787, for the glass cockpit to improve pilots' situation awareness and efficiency. Boeing plans no major modifications for the 737 MAX flight deck, as it wants to maintain commonality with the 737 Next Generation family. Boeing Commercial Airplanes CEO Jim Albaugh said in 2011, that adding more fly-by-wire control systems would be "very minimal". However, the 737 MAX extended spoilers are fly-by-wire controlled. Most of the systems are carried from the 737NG to allow for a short differences-training course to upgrade flight crews.

In addition to the Speed Trim System (STS), the automatic stabilizer control system has been enhanced to include MCAS. Compared to STS, MCAS has greater authority and cannot be disengaged with the aft and forward column cutout switches. The center console stabilizer-trim cutout switches have been re-wired. Unlike previous versions of the 737, the automatic stabilizer trim control functions cannot be turned off while retaining electric trim switches functionality.

MCAS was deemed necessary by Boeing to meet its internal objective of minimizing training requirements for pilots already qualified on the 737NG. MCAS was to automatically mitigate the pitch-up tendency of the new flight geometry due to the engines being located farther forward and higher than on previous 737 models. During a reassessment of the aircraft in February 2020, both FAA and EASA determined that the stability and stall characteristics of the plane would have been acceptable with or without MCAS.

As a production standard, the 737 MAX features the Boeing Sky Interior with overhead bins and LED lighting based on the Boeing 787's interior.

=== Engines ===
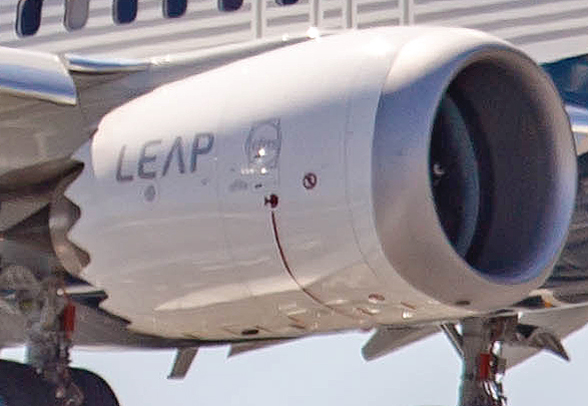
CFM LEAP engine nacelle with chevrons for noise reduction

In 2011, the CFM LEAP-1B engine was initially 10–12% more efficient than the previous 61-inch (156 cm) CFM56 of the 737NG. The 18-blade, woven carbon-fiber fan enables a 9:1 bypass ratio (up from 5.1:1 with the previous 24-blade titanium fan) for a 40% smaller noise footprint. The CFM56 bypass ranges from 5.1:1 to 5.5:1. The two-spool design has a low-pressure section comprising the fan and three booster stages driven by five axial turbine stages and a high-pressure section with a 10-stage axial compressor driven by a two-stage turbine. The 41:1 overall pressure ratio increased from 28:1, and advanced hot-section materials enabling higher operating temperatures permit a 15% reduction in thrust-specific fuel consumption (TSFC), along with 20% lower carbon emissions, 50% lower nitrogen-oxide emissions, though each engine weighs 849 pounds (385 kg) more at 6,129 pounds (2,780 kg).

In August 2011, Boeing had to choose between 66-inch (168 cm) or 68-inch (173 cm) fan diameters, necessitating landing gear changes to maintain a 17 in (43 cm) ground clearance beneath the new engines; Boeing Commercial Airplanes chief executive officer Jim Albaugh stated "with a bigger fan you get more efficiency because of the bypass ratio [but also] more weight and more drag", with more airframe changes.

In November 2011, Boeing selected the larger fan diameter, necessitating a 6–8 in (15–20 cm) longer nose landing gear. In May 2012, Boeing further enlarged the fan to 69.4 in (176 cm), paired with a smaller engine core within minor design changes before the mid-2013 final configuration.

The nacelle features chevrons for noise reduction like the 787. A new bleed air digital regulator will improve its reliability. The new nacelles being larger and more forward possess aerodynamic properties which act to further increase the pitch rate. The larger engine is cantilevered ahead of and slightly above the wing, and the laminar flow engine nacelle lipskin is a GKN Aerospace one-piece, spun-formed aluminum sheet inspired by the 787.

== Operational history ==
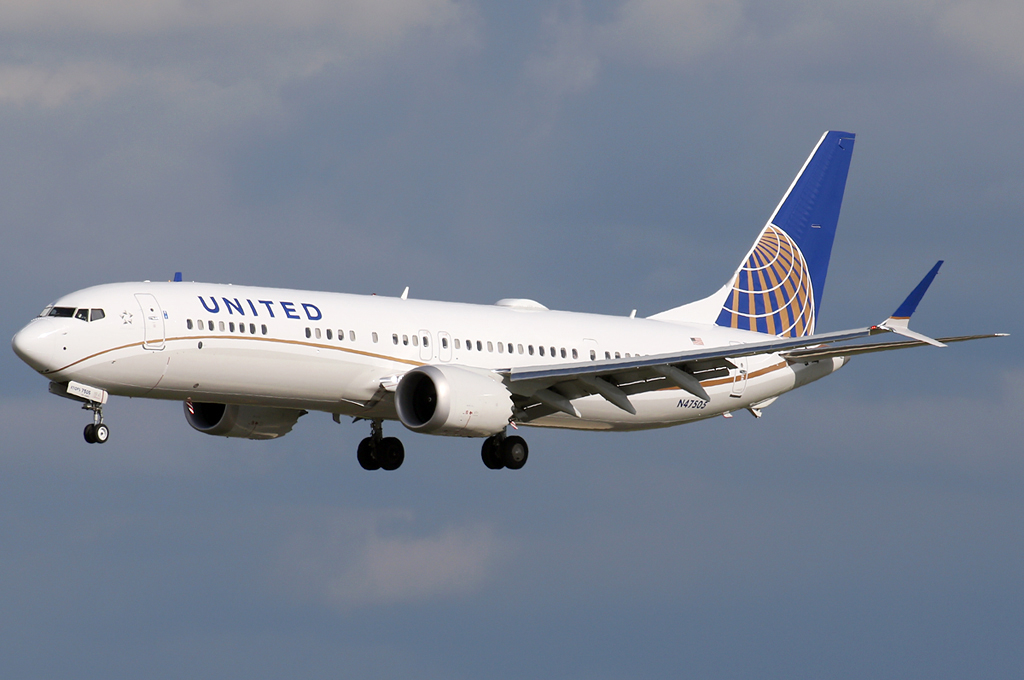
United Airlines 737 MAX 9, 2018

After one year of service, 130 MAXs had been delivered to 28 customers, logging over 41,000 flights in 118,000 hours and flying over 6.5 million passengers. Flydubai observed 15% more efficiency than the NG, more than the 14% promised, and dependability reached 99.4%. Long routes include 24 over 2,500 nautical miles (4,630 km; 2,877 mi), including a daily Aerolíneas Argentinas service from Buenos Aires to Punta Cana over 3,252 nmi (6,023 km; 3,742 mi).

In 2019, Moody's had estimated Boeing's operating margin to be US$12–15 million for each 737 MAX 8 at its list price of $121.6 million (~$151 million in 2025), although the list price is usually discounted 50–55% in practice. This high margin was made possible by the efficiencies of production volume and the amortization of development costs and capital investment over the decades of the program run. However, costs have since risen significantly and the margin reduced following the two crashes, the FAA grounding, and the severe disruption to production. Boeing estimated it would cost an additional $6.3 billion to produce the remaining 737 MAX program, $4 billion for "future abnormal costs" as production restarted, plus an estimated $8.3 billion for concessions and compensation to customers. The rising costs also led Moody's to downgrade Boeing's credit rating.

== Variants ==
The 737 MAX 7, MAX 8 and MAX 9 succeed the 737-700, -800, and -900ER, respectively—the most widely used variants of the previous 737 Next Generation series. Since 2020, their official FAA type certificate and marketing designations have been 737-7, 737-8, and 737-9. The MAX 8 entered service in May 2017, followed by the MAX 9 in March 2018, and the MAX 200, a high-density variant of the MAX 8, in June 2021. Deliveries of the MAX 7 and MAX 10 have not yet begun, following years of certification delays.

The MAX 8 is the most widely ordered variant. In 2018, Boeing projected that 60–65% of demand would be for the midsized MAX 8, 20–25% for the larger MAX 9 and MAX 10, and 10% for the smaller MAX 7.

=== 737 MAX 7 ===
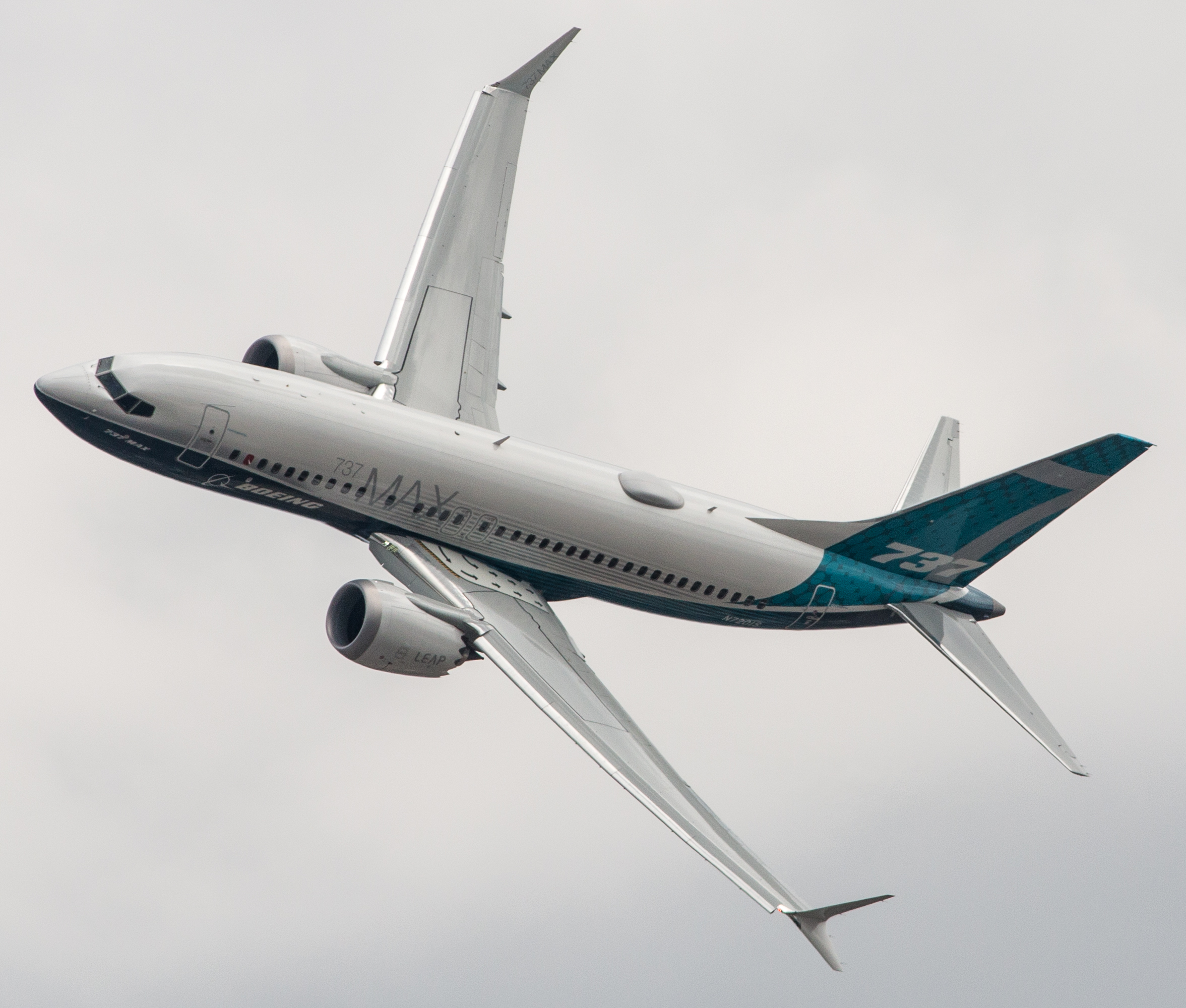
Boeing 737 MAX 7 at the 2018 Farnborough Airshow

At the July 2016 Farnborough Air Show, Boeing announced that the MAX 7, originally based on the 737-700, will accommodate two more seat rows than the 737-700 for 138 seats. Compared to the 737-700, the MAX 7 has a pair of over-wing exit doors rather than the single-door, a 46-inch (120 cm) longer aft fuselage and a 30-inch (76 cm) longer forward fuselage, structural re-gauging and strengthening, and systems and interior modifications to accommodate the longer length. The MAX 7 uses the same wing and landing gear as the MAX 8. It is expected to fly 1,000 nautical miles (1,900 km; 1,200 mi) farther than the -700 with 18% lower fuel costs per seat. Boeing predicts that the MAX 7 will carry 12 more passengers 400 nautical miles (740 km; 460 mi) farther than A319neo with seven percent lower operating costs per seat.

Production on the first 65-foot-long (20 m) wing spar for the 737 MAX 7 began in October 2017. Assembly of the first flight-test aircraft began on November 22, 2017, and was rolled out of the factory on February 5, 2018. The MAX 7 took off for its first flight on March 16, 2018, from the factory in Renton, Washington, and flew for three hours over Washington state. It reached 250 knots (460 km/h; 290 mph) and 25,000 feet (7,600 m), performed a low approach, systems checks and an inflight engine restart, and landed at Boeing's flight test center in Moses Lake, Washington.

Entry into service with launch operator Southwest Airlines was originally expected in January 2019; however, it has been repeatedly delayed. Southwest had ordered a total of 234 MAX 7s. WestJet also ordered 22 MAX 7s, but later converted those into MAX 8s amid the delays. In 2022, Southwest announced that it would take early delivery of its MAX 8 orders to make up for the delay of the MAX 7. In January 2024, Southwest removed the MAX 7 from future fleet planning, but the company said that it remained committed to the type and was willing to wait for first delivery.

Boeing completed the anti-ice redesign in November 2025, solving a major hurdle in the aircraft type's certification process. The MAX 7 was certified by the FAA on August 3, 2026. The aircraft's first delivery is expected to be to a Boeing Business Jet customer.

=== 737 MAX 8 ===
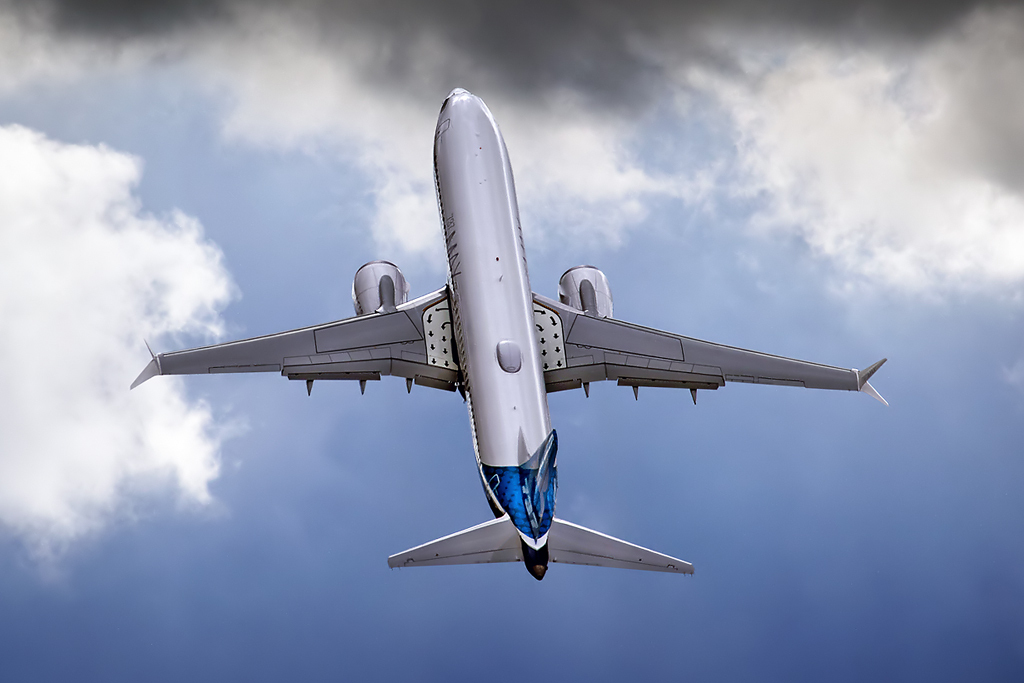
A top view of the 737 MAX 8 showing double overwing exits

The first variant developed in the 737 MAX series; the MAX 8 replaces the 737-800 with a longer fuselage than the MAX 7. In 2016, Boeing planned to improve its range from 3,515 nautical miles (6,510 km; 4,045 mi) to 3,610 nmi (6,690 km; 4,150 mi) after 2021. On July 23, 2013, Boeing completed the firm configuration for the 737 MAX 8. The MAX 8 has a lower empty weight and higher maximum takeoff weight than the A320neo. During a test flight conducted for Aviation Week, while cruising at a true airspeed of 449 knots (517 mph; 832 km/h) and a weight of 140,500 pounds (63,700 kg), at a lower than optimal altitude (FL350 vs. the preferred FL390) and with an "unusually far forward" center of gravity, the test aircraft consumed 4,460 lb (2,020 kg) of fuel per hour.

The Boeing 737 MAX 8 completed its first flight test in La Paz, Bolivia. The 13,300-foot (4,100 m) altitude at El Alto International Airport tested the MAX's capability to take off and land at high altitudes. Its first commercial flight was operated by Malindo Air on May 22, 2017, between Kuala Lumpur and Singapore as Flight OD803. In early 2017, a new MAX 8 was valued at $52.85 million, rising to below $54.5 million by mid 2018.

==== 737 MAX 200 ====
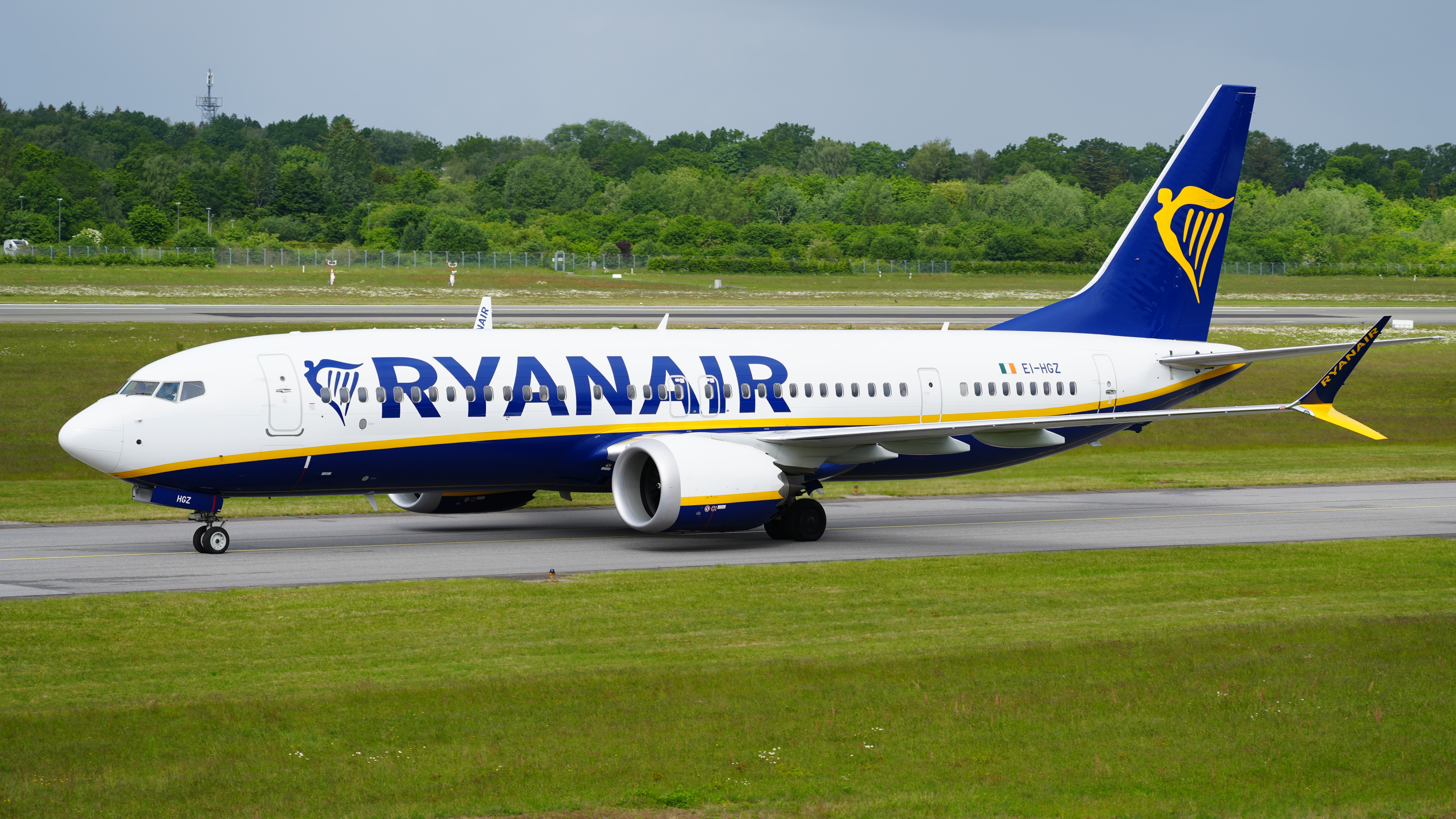
A Boeing 737 MAX 200 of Ryanair with the extra pair of exit doors

In September 2014, Boeing launched a high-density version of the 737 MAX 8, the 737 MAX 200, also called the 737-8-200, 737-8200, or 737 MAX 8-200. named for seating for up to 200 passengers in a single-class high-density configuration with slimline seats; an extra pair of exit doors is required because of the higher passenger capacity. Later the 737 MAX 200 was certified to accommodate up to 210 passengers. Boeing states that this version would be 20% more cost-efficient per seat than current 737 models and would be the most efficient narrow-body on the market when delivered, including 5% lower operating costs than the 737 MAX 8. Three of eight service trolleys are omitted to accommodate more passenger space. An order by Ryanair for 100 aircraft was finalized in December 2014.

In mid-November 2018, the first of then 135 ordered by Ryanair rolled out, in a 197-seat configuration. It was first flown from Renton on January 13, 2019, and was due to enter service in April 2019, with another four MAX 200s expected later in 2019, though certification and deliveries were deferred while the MAX was grounded. In November 2019, Ryanair informed its pilots that, due to an unspecified design issue with the additional over-wing exit doors, it did not expect to receive any MAX 200s until late April or early May 2020. In 2020, at the height of the COVID travel slump, Ryanair renegotiated its order and purchased an additional 75 MAX 200 aircraft at one-third of the list price.

The high-density variant was certified by the FAA on March 31, 2021. Ryanair took delivery of its first MAX 200 in June 2021. Besides launch customer Ryanair, other customers include International Airlines Group and low-cost airlines Akasa Air of India, Allegiant Air of the US, Arajet of the Dominican Republic and Vietnam's VietJet.

==== Proposed 737-8ERX ====
Airlines have been shown a 737-8ERX concept based on the 737 MAX 8 with a higher 194,700-pound (88.3 t) maximum take-off weight and a longer range of 4,000 nautical miles (7,400 km; 4,600 mi) using the wings, landing gear, and central section from the MAX 9. The range of this aircraft would be closer to the Airbus A321LR, although with a smaller 150 seat capacity.

=== 737 MAX 9 ===
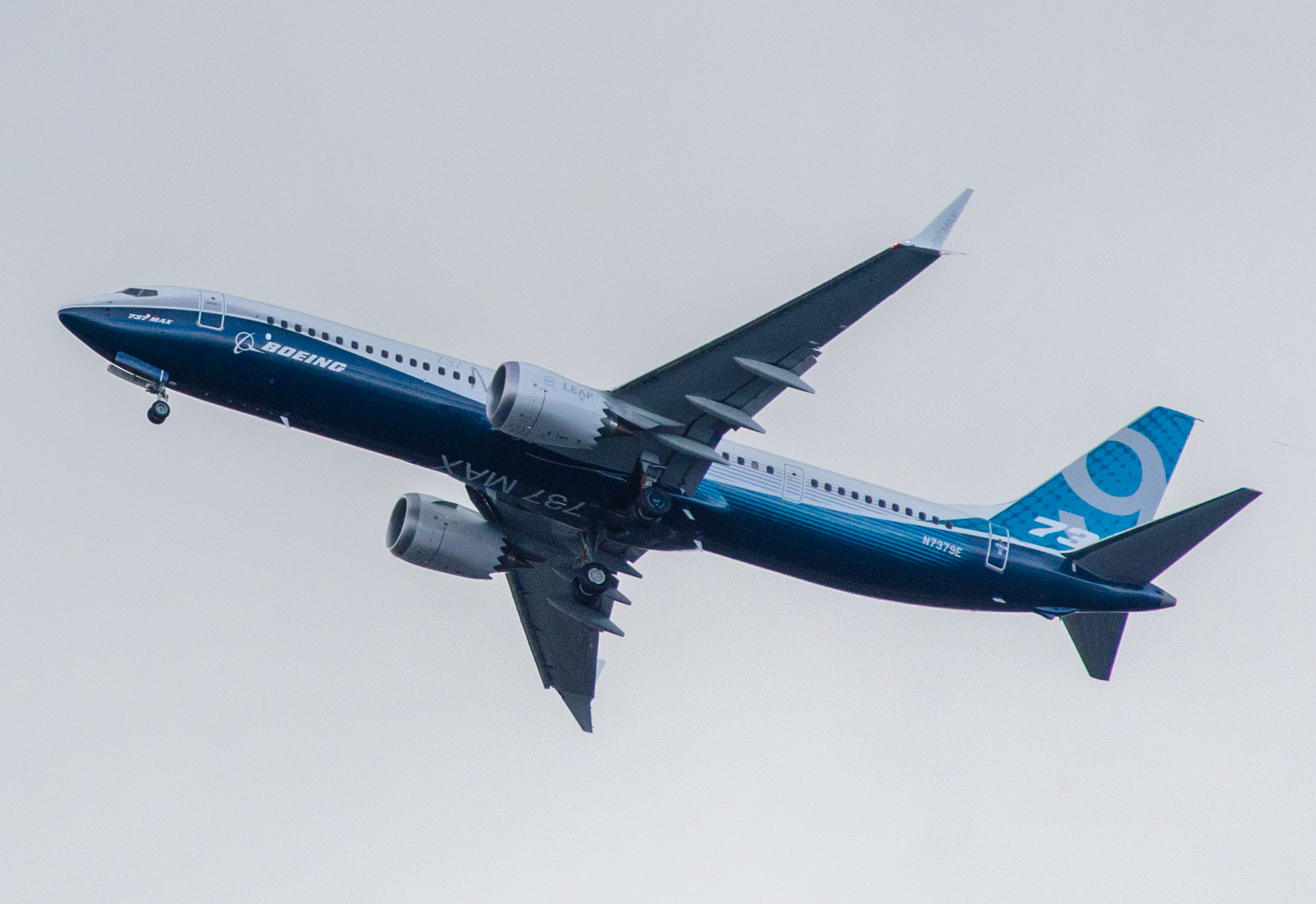
737 MAX 9 first flight on April 13, 2017

The 737 MAX 9 replaces the 737-900 and has a longer fuselage than the MAX 8. In 2016, Boeing planned to improve its range from 3,510 nautical miles (6,500 km; 4,040 mi) to 3,605 nmi (6,676 km; 4,149 mi) after 2021. Lion Air was the launch customer with an order for 201 in February 2012. It made its roll-out on March 7, 2017, and first flight on April 13, 2017; it took off from Renton Municipal Airport and landed at Boeing Field after a 2 hr 42 min flight. It was presented at the 2017 Paris Air Show.

Boeing 737 MAX 9 flight tests were scheduled to run through 2017, with 30% of the -8 tests repeated; aircraft 1D001 was used for auto-land, avionics, flutter, and mostly stability-and-control trials, while 1D002 was used for environment control system testing. It was certified by February 2018. Asian low-cost carrier Lion Air Group took delivery of the first MAX 9 on March 21, 2018, before entering service with Thai Lion Air. As the competing Airbus A321neo attracted more orders, the sale value of a 737 MAX 9, as of 2018, was the same as a MAX 8 at $53 million (~$66.8 million in 2025).

=== 737 MAX 10 ===
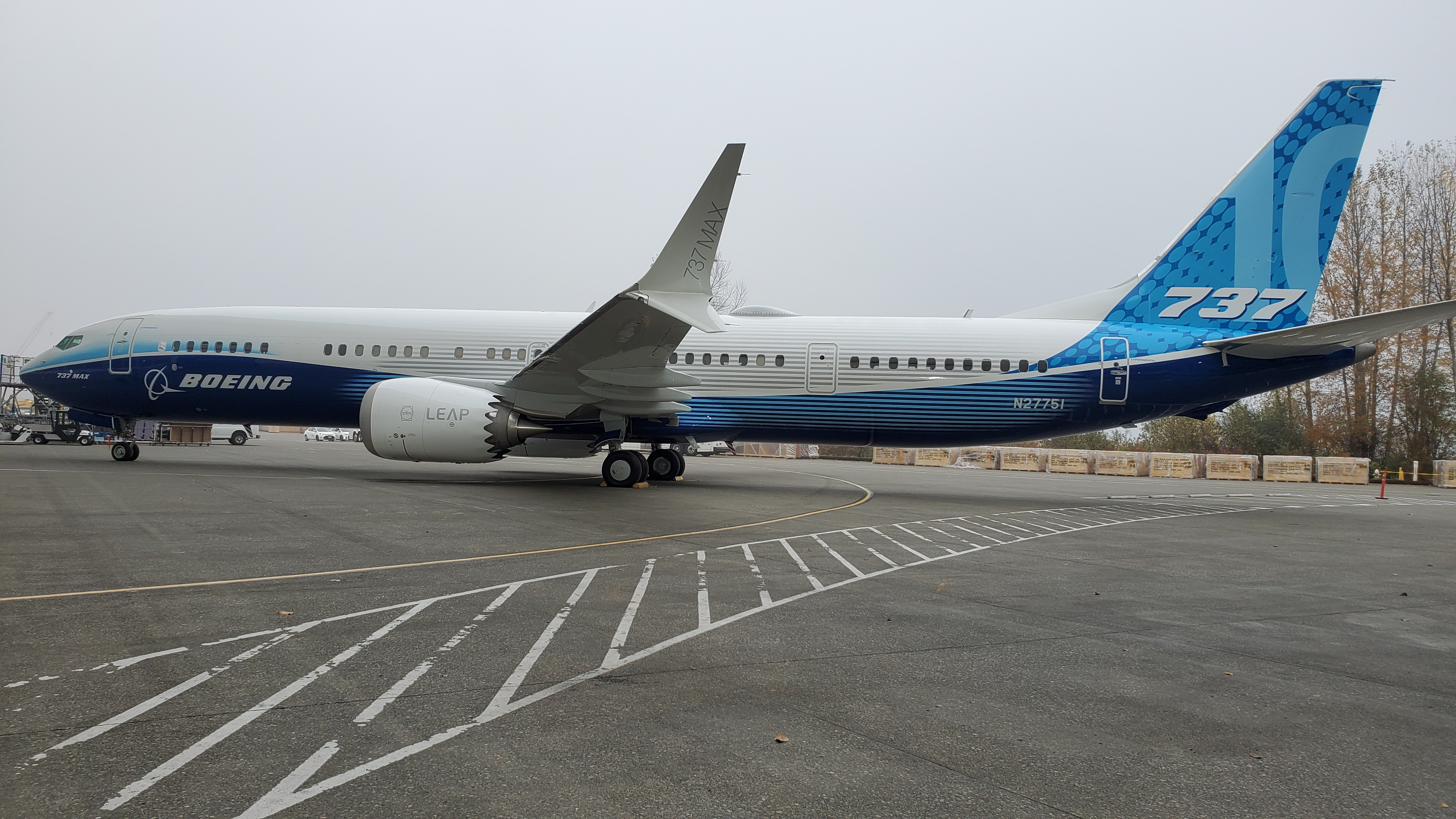
Boeing 737 MAX 10 prototype in its roll-out ceremony

Loyal customers, such as Korean Air and United Airlines, pressed Boeing to develop a variant larger than the MAX 9 in order to compete with the Airbus A321neo, of which Boeing revealed studies in early 2016. As the Airbus A321neo had outsold the MAX 9 five-to-one, the proposed MAX 10 included larger engines, stronger wings, and telescoping landing gear in mid-2016. In September 2016, it was reported that the variant would be simpler and lower-risk, with a modest stretch of 6–7 feet (1.83–2.13 m) for a length of 143–144 ft (43.6–43.9 m), seating 12–18 more passengers for 192–198 in a dual-class layout or 226-232 for a single class, needing an uprated 31,000 pounds-force (140 kN) LEAP-1B that could be available by 2019 or 2020, and would likely require a landing-gear modification to move the rotation point slightly aft.

In October 2016, Boeing's board of directors granted authority to offer the stretched variant with two extra fuselage sections forward and aft with a 3,100 nautical miles (5,700 km; 3,600 mi) range, reduced from the 3,300 nmi (6,100 km; 3,800 mi) range of the MAX 9. In early 2017, Boeing showed a 66 inches (1.7 m) stretch to 143 ft (44 m), enabling seating for 230 in a single class or 189 in two-class capacity, compared to 193 in two-class seating for the A321neo. The modest stretch of the MAX 10 enables the aircraft to retain the existing wing, and the Leap 1B engine from the MAX 9 with a trailing-link main landing gear as the only major change. Boeing 737 MAX Vice President and General Manager Keith Leverkuhn said the design had to be frozen in 2018, for a 2020 introduction.

Boeing hopes that 737 operators and 737 MAX customers like United Airlines, Delta Air Lines, Alaska Airlines, Air Canada, Lion Air, and Chinese airlines will be interested in the new variant. Boeing predicts a 5% lower trip cost and seat cost compared to the A321neo. Air Lease Corporation wants it a year sooner; its CEO John Pleuger stated, "It would have been better to get the first airplane in March 2019, but I don't think that's possible." AerCap CEO Aengus Kelly is cautious and said the -9 and -10 "will cannibalize each other".

The 737 MAX 10 was launched on June 19, 2017, with 240 orders and commitments from more than ten customers. United Airlines will be the largest 737 MAX 10 customer, converting 100 of its 161 orders for the MAX 9 into orders for the MAX 10. Boeing ended the 2017 Paris Air Show with 361 orders and commitments, including 214 conversions, from 16 customers, including 50 orders from Lion Air.

The variant configuration was firmed up by February 2018, and by mid-2018, the critical design review was completed. As of August 2018, assembly was underway with a first flight planned for late 2019. The semi-levered landing gear design has a telescoping oleo-pneumatic strut with a down-swinging lever to permit 9.5 inches (24 cm) taller gear. Driven by the existing retraction system, a shrink-link mechanical linkage mechanism at the top of the leg, inspired by carrier aircraft designs, allows the gear to be drawn in and shortened while being retracted into the existing wheel well. Entry into service was slated for July 2020.

On November 22, 2019, Boeing unveiled the first MAX 10 to employees in its Renton factory, Washington, scheduled for the first flight in 2020. At the time, 531 MAX 10s were on order, compared to the 3142 Airbus A321neos sold, capable of carrying 244 passengers or to fly up to 4,700 nautical miles (8,700 km; 5,400 mi) in its heaviest A321XLR variant. The MAX 10 has similar capacity as the A321XLR, but shorter range and much poorer field performance, greatly hindering its potential to service smaller airports as compared to the A321XLR.

By early 2021, Boeing expected 737 MAX 10 deliveries to start in 2023. The variant made its maiden flight on June 18, 2021, initiating its flight test and certification program.

On June 29, 2021, United Airlines placed an order for another 150 of the Boeing 737 MAX 10. These MAX 10 will replace a large number of United's older Boeing 757-200s. In January 2024, United CEO Kirby noted in an interview that the airline was in the process of developing plans that did not include the MAX 10 in its future fleet.

In September 2021, Ryanair failed to reach an agreement with Boeing over an order of MAX 10s, citing cost as a primary concern. However, in May 2023, Ryanair announced the order of 150 MAX 10s and an option to purchase a further 150.

In November 2022, Boeing Commercial Airplanes CEO Stanley Deal told investors at a conference that the MAX 10 was expected to enter service in 2024, though this did not happen. In October 2024, Delta Air Lines expected to receive its first deliveries of the MAX 10 in 2026.

In November 2025, the certification of the type was pushed back into 2026. However, Boeing finalized a redesign to the engine anti-ice system. The variant's launch customer is planned to be WestJet with deliveries beginning in 2027. United Airlines expects to start flying them in the first half of 2027. The FAA certified the MAX 10 on October 20, 2026.

=== Boeing Business Jet (BBJ) ===
The BBJ MAX 8 and BBJ MAX 9 are business jet variants of the 737 MAX 8 and 9, with new CFM LEAP-1B engines and advanced winglets providing 13% better fuel burn than the Boeing Business Jet; the BBJ MAX 8 has a 6,325 nautical miles (11,710 km; 7,280 mi) range, and the BBJ MAX 9 a 6,255 nmi (7,200 mi; 11,580 km) range. The BBJ MAX 7 was unveiled in October 2016, with a 7,000 nmi (12,960 km; 8,060 mi) range and 10% lower operating costs than the original BBJ, while being larger. The BBJ MAX 8 first flew on April 16, 2018, before delivery later the same year, and has a range of 6,640 nmi (12,300 km; 7,640 mi) with an auxiliary fuel tank.

=== Comparison ===
Below is a list of major differences between the 737 MAX variants.

| Variant | 737 MAX 7 | 737 MAX 8 (Note: Includes 737 MAX 200) | 737 MAX 9 | 737 MAX 10 |
|---|---|---|---|---|
| Typical seating | 153 (8J + 145Y) | 178 (12J + 166Y) | 193 (16J + 177Y) | 204 (16J + 188Y) |
| Maximum seats | 172 | 189 (Note: When configured as 737 MAX 8) or 210 (Note: When configured as 737 MAX 200) | 220 | 230 |
| Cargo capacity | 1,139 ft^{3} (32.3 m^{3}) | 1,540 ft^{3} (44 m^{3}) | 1,811 ft^{3} (51.3 m^{3}) | 1,961 ft^{3} (55.5 m^{3}) |
| Length | 116 ft 8 in (35.56 m) | 129 ft 6 in (39.47 m) | 138 ft 4 in (42.16 m) | 143 ft 8 in (43.79 m) |
| Maximum takeoff weight (MTOW) | 177,000 lb (80,000 kg) | 182,200 lb (82,600 kg) | 194,700 lb (88,300 kg) | 197,900 lb (89,800 kg) |
| Range | 3,800 nmi (7,000 km; 4,400 mi) | 3,500 nmi (6,500 km; 4,000 mi) (Note: MAX 200: 2,700 nmi (5,000 km; 3,100 mi)) | 3,300 nmi (6,100 km; 3,800 mi) | 3,100 nmi (5,700 km; 3,600 mi) |
| Takeoff (SL, ISA, MTOW) | 7,000 ft (2,100 m) | 8,300 ft (2,500 m) | 8,500 ft (2,600 m) | |
| Landing (SL, MLW, dry) | 5,000 ft (1,500 m) | 5,000 ft (1,500 m) | 5,500 ft (1,700 m) | |
| ICAO Type | B37M | B38M | B39M | B3XM |

== Operators ==
As of October 2023, the five largest operators of the Boeing 737 MAX were Southwest Airlines (207), United Airlines (145), Ryanair Holdings (126), Alaska Airlines (62), and American Airlines (54).

=== Orders and deliveries ===
American Airlines was the first disclosed customer. By November 17, 2011, there were 700 commitments from nine customers, including Lion Air and SMBC Aviation Capital. By December 2011, the 737 MAX had 948 commitments and firm orders from thirteen customers. On September 8, 2014, Ryanair agreed to 100 firm orders with 100 options. In January 2017, aircraft leasing company GECAS ordered 75. By January 2019 the 737 MAX had 5,011 firm orders from 78 identified customers, with the top three being Southwest Airlines with 280, flydubai with 251, and Lion Air with 251. The first 737 MAX 8 was delivered to Malindo Air on May 16, 2017.

Following the groundings in March 2019, Boeing suspended all deliveries of 737 MAX aircraft, reduced production from 52 to 42 aircraft per month, and on December 16, 2019, announced that production would be suspended from January 2020 to conserve cash. At the time of the grounding, the 737 MAX had 4,636 unfilled orders valued at an estimated $600 billion. Boeing produced over 450 MAX aircraft awaiting delivery, about half of which are expected to be delivered in 2021, and the majority of the remainder in 2022. By November 30, 2020, at the time of the ungrounding, the unfilled orders stood at 4,039 aircraft. In November 2021, during the Dubai Airshow, Boeing received 72 firm orders from a new 737 MAX customer, India based Akasa Air, to be fulfilled over a 4-year period with first delivery in June 2022. In late January 2022 Boeing was working to clear the remaining inventory of 335 MAX aircraft and estimated most of them would be delivered by the end of 2023. In December 2022, the 1000th 737 MAX was delivered. In July 2023, Boeing first revealed the 737 MAX sub-type orders as follows: 2,751 MAX 8 (63%), 810 MAX 10 (19%), 344 MAX 200 (8%), 297 MAX 7 (7%), and 137 MAX 9 (3%). As of October 2026, the 737 MAX has 4,985 unfilled orders and 2,515 deliveries. 737 MAX sub-type orders are as follows: 276 MAX 7, 2,990 MAX 8 (incl. 207 MAX 200), 175 MAX 9 and 1,544 MAX 10.

Boeing 737 MAX orders and deliveries
| | 2011 | 2012 | 2013 | 2014 | 2015 | 2016 | 2017 | 2018 | 2019 | 2020 | 2021 | 2022 | 2023 | 2024 | 2025 | 2026 | Total |
| Orders | 150 | 914 | 708 | 891 | 410 | 540 | 774 | 662 (Note: In 2018, there were 675 net orders for 737 program, of which 13 orders were for 737NG.) | −136 (Note: In 2019, there were 47 orders, but 183 cancellations of 737 MAX.) | −529 (Note: In 2020, there were 112 orders, but 641 cancellations of 737 MAX.) | 375 (Note: In 2021, there were 749 orders, but 374 cancellations of 737 MAX.) | 561 | 883 | 242 | 577 | 540 | 7,500 |
| Deliveries | – | – | – | – | – | – | 74 | 256 | 57 | 27 | 245 | 374 | 387 | 260 | 440 | 395 | 2,515 |

Cumulative Boeing 737 MAX orders and deliveries

Orders Deliveries — as of October 2026

== Accidents and incidents ==
=== Lion Air Flight 610 ===
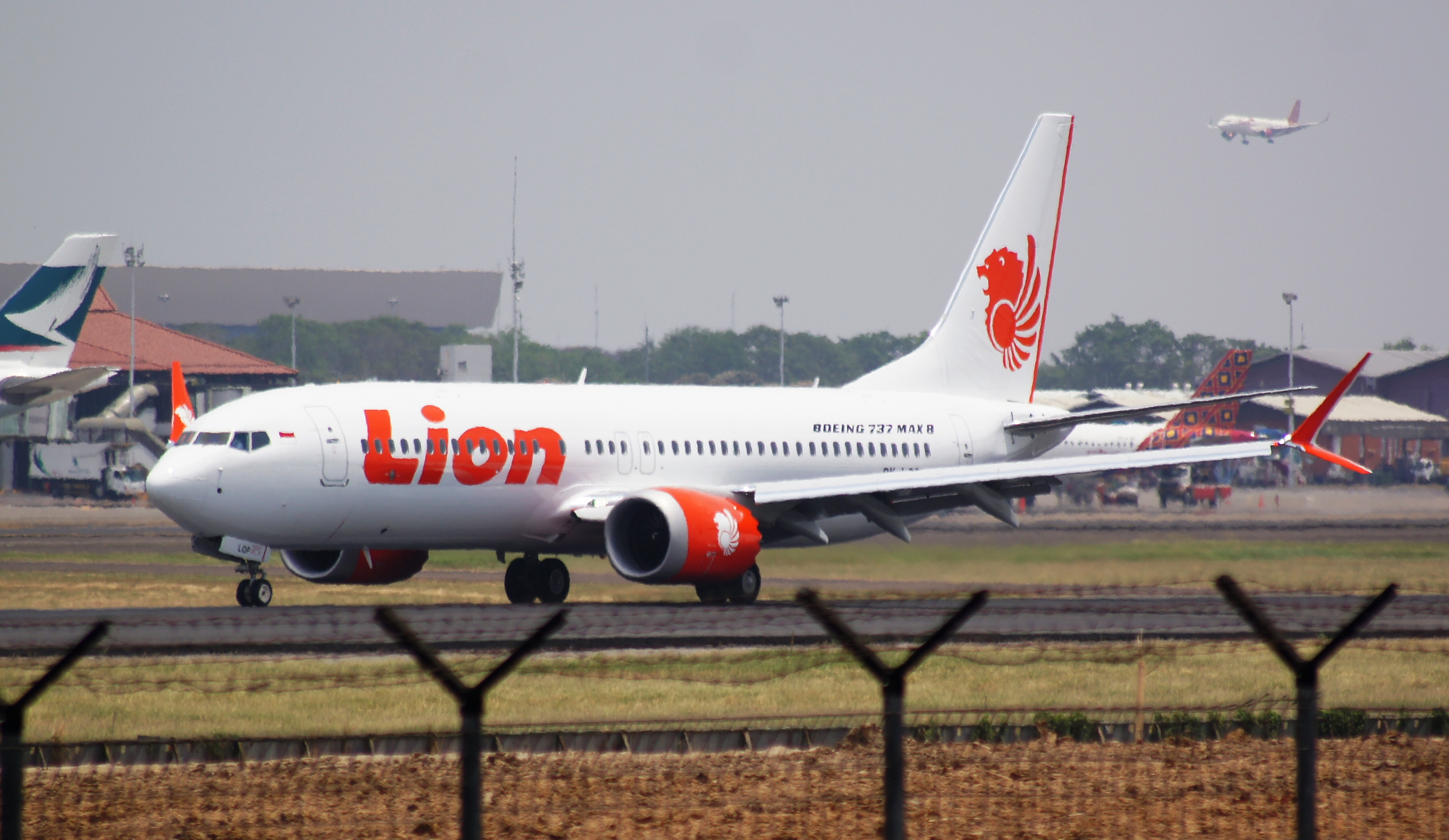
The 737 MAX 8 involved in the crash of Lion Air Flight 610

On October 29, 2018, Lion Air Flight 610, a recently delivered 737 MAX 8, crashed into the Java Sea 13 minutes after takeoff from Soekarno–Hatta International Airport, Jakarta, Indonesia. The flight was a scheduled domestic flight to Depati Amir Airport, Pangkal Pinang, Indonesia. All 189 people on board died. This was the first fatal aviation crash and first hull loss of a 737 MAX. The aircraft had been delivered to Lion Air two months earlier. People familiar with the investigation reported that during a flight piloted by a different crew on the day before the crash, the same aircraft experienced a similar malfunction but an extra pilot sitting in the cockpit jumpseat correctly diagnosed the problem and told the crew how to disable the malfunctioning Maneuvering Characteristics Augmentation System (MCAS) flight-control system. Indonesia's National Transportation Safety Committee released its final report into the crash on October 25, 2019, attributing the crash to the MCAS pushing the aircraft into a dive due to data from a faulty angle-of-attack sensor, causing the aircraft to think it was pitching up more than it was in reality. Following the Lion Air crash, Boeing issued an operational manual guidance, advising airlines on how to address erroneous cockpit readings.

=== Ethiopian Airlines Flight 302 ===
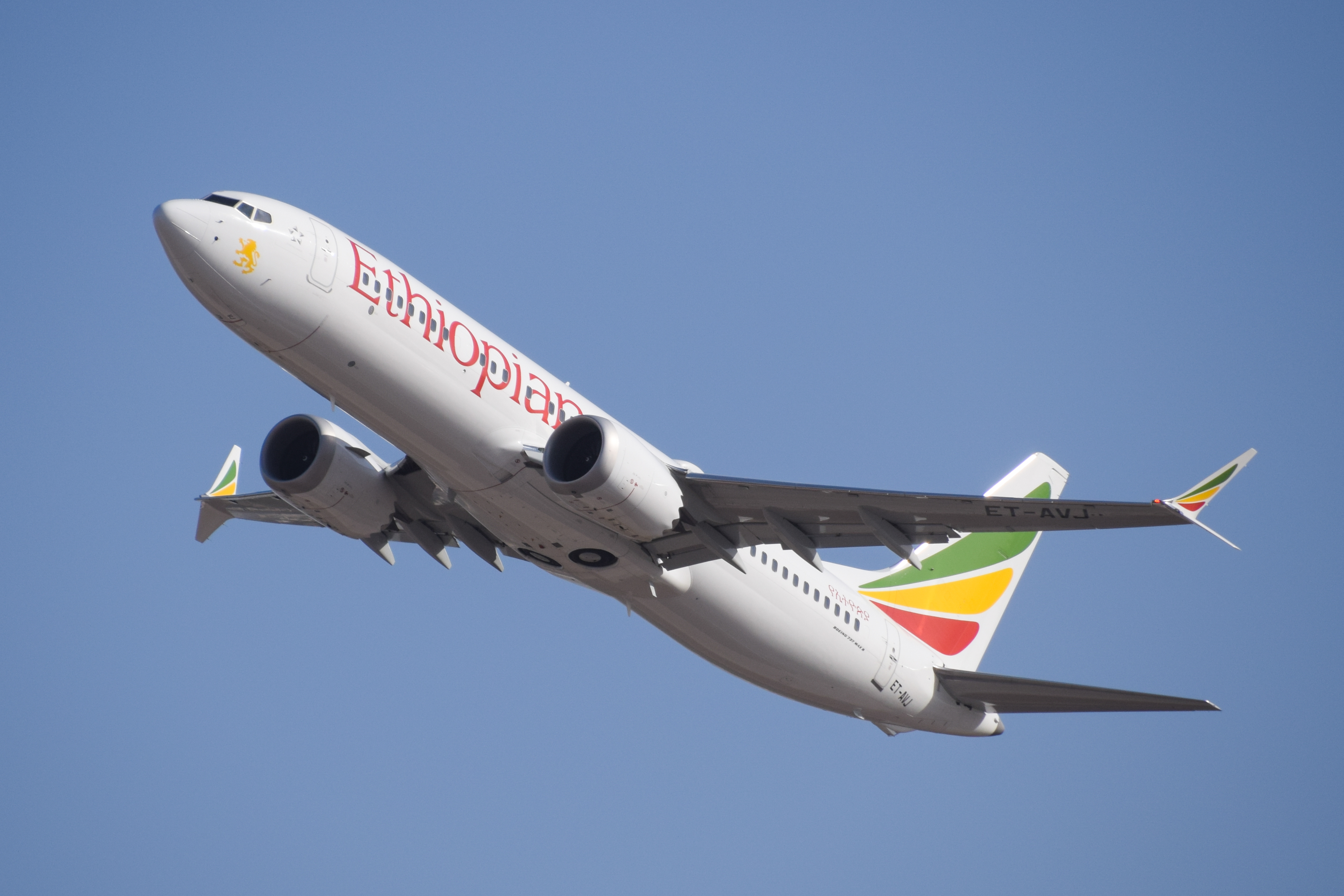
The 737 MAX 8 involved in the crash of Ethiopian Airlines Flight 302

On March 10, 2019, Ethiopian Airlines Flight 302, operated by a four-month-old 737 MAX 8, crashed approximately six minutes after takeoff from Addis Ababa, Ethiopia, on a scheduled flight to Nairobi, Kenya, killing all 149 passengers and 8 crew members. The cause of the crash was initially unclear, though the aircraft's vertical speed after takeoff was reported to be unstable. Evidence retrieved on the crash site suggests, that at the time of the crash, the aircraft was configured to dive, similar to Lion Air Flight 610. The similarity of the physical and flight data evidence from the accidents led to the global 737 MAX groundings beginning on the day of the second accident, with the aircraft returning to service on December 9, 2020.

=== Alaska Airlines Flight 1282 ===
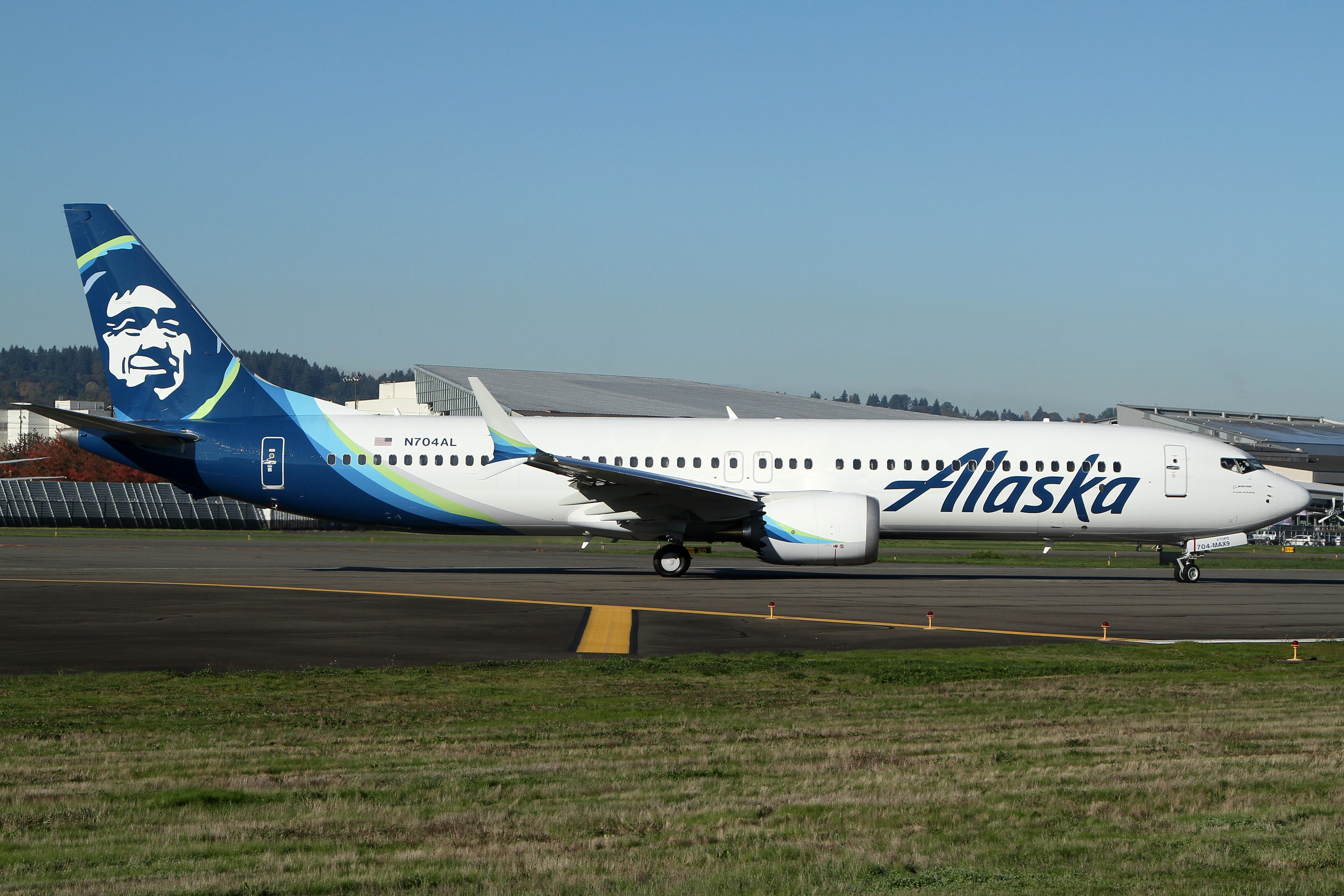
The 737 MAX 9 involved in the decompression of Alaska Airlines Flight 1282

On January 5, 2024, Alaska Airlines Flight 1282, a 737 MAX 9, suffered an uncontrolled decompression shortly after takeoff from Portland International Airport due to the blow-out of a mid-cabin exit door plug shortly after takeoff. The MAX 9, like the 737-900ER, features a rear mid-cabin emergency exit door on each side behind the wings that is required when used with dense seating configurations. On less densely configured aircraft those emergency exits are not required, and door-shaped plugs are installed in their place, as was the case on this aircraft.

The plane returned to Portland, and there were no fatalities or significant injuries among the 171 passengers and 6 crew on board. Some small personal belongings, along with cabin trim such as seat covers and headrests, were sucked out of the opening. According to some passengers, a child seated near them had his shirt pulled off by the airflow and sucked out of the aircraft while his mother held him. The FAA, Boeing, Alaska Airlines, and the NTSB quickly acknowledged the accident and an investigation was launched. As a precautionary measure, Alaska Airlines grounded its 737 MAX 9 fleet. Hours later, the FAA ordered the grounding and inspection of 171 aircraft from the global 737 MAX 9 fleet with similar configuration to the incident aircraft, along with corrective action if necessary. Alaska Airlines and United Airlines both reported finding loose door plug bolts on some of the aircraft inspected.

On February 5, 2024, the NTSB said in its preliminary report that the four key bolts that should have secured the door plug were not installed on delivery to Alaska Airlines because Boeing had opened the door plug at its Renton factory to repair damaged rivets, then failed to secure it.

== Specifications ==
=== MAX 8 with LEAP-1B28 ===
Data from

General characteristics

- Crew: 2
- Capacity: 210, 1,540 cu ft (43.6 m²) of cargo
- Length: 129 ft 6 in (39.52 m)
- Wingspan: 117 ft 10 in (35.9 m)
- Width: 12 ft 4 in (3.76 m) (fuselage)
- Height: 40 ft 4 in (12.3 m)
- Max takeoff weight: 182,200 lb (82,640 kg)
- Fuel capacity: 6,820 US gal (25,817 L) by volume, 45,694 lb (20,730 kg) by weight
- Powerplant: 2 × CFM International LEAP-1B28 high-bypass turbofan, 28,690 lbf (127.6 kN) thrust each

Performance

- Range: 4,000 mi (6,500 km, 3,500 nmi)
- Service ceiling: 41,000 ft (12,000 m)
- Takeoff distance: 8,300 ft (2,500 m)
- Landing distance: 5,000 ft (1,500 m)

=== MAX 9 ===
Data from

General characteristics

- Capacity: 220
- Length: 138 ft 2 in (42.1 m)
- Wingspan: 117 ft 10 in (35.92 m)
- Max takeoff weight: 194,700 lb (88,310 kg)

Performance

- Range: 3,300 mi (5,300 km, 2,900 nmi)
- Service ceiling: 41,000 ft (12,000 m)

=== MAX 10 ===
The MAX 10 was certified by the FAA on 20 October 2026.

Data from

General characteristics

- Capacity: 230
- Length: 143 ft 8 in (43.8 m)
- Wingspan: 117 ft 10 in (35.92 m)
- Max takeoff weight: 197,900 lb (89,760 kg)

Performance

- Range: 3,100 mi (5,000 km, 2,700 nmi)
- Service ceiling: 41,000 ft (12,000 m)

== See also ==
- Financial impact of the Boeing 737 MAX groundings
- Competition between Airbus and Boeing

Related development

- Boeing 737 Next Generation
- Boeing Business Jet

Aircraft of comparable role, configuration, and era

- Airbus A220-300
- Airbus A320neo family
- Comac C919
- Yakovlev MC-21
