= Organization Designation Authorization =

American airworthiness program of the FAA

FAA document that establishes the ODA program

The Organization Designation Authorization (ODA) program was established by FAA Order 8100.15() (image at right). The ODA, in conjunction with the Federal Aviation Administration (FAA), grants airworthiness designee authority to organizations or companies. The regulations addressing the ODA program are found in Title 14 of the Code of Federal Regulations (14 CFR) part 183, subpart D, sections 183.41 through 813.67.

The ODA program's intention is to elaborate on the tasks that are available their organizations design authorizations. While adding in this "final rule" for designs, the ODA also added in a phase-out timeline for design programs.

The FAA asserted that the ODA program does not introduce any type of self-certification. However, the practice has been criticized for substantial manufacturer influence over personnel designation and design certification, particularly after the Boeing 787 Dreamliner battery fires in 2013 and the Boeing 737 MAX groundings in 2019.

== Purpose ==
"The ODA program expands the scope of approved tasks available to organizational designees; increases the number of organizations eligible for organizational designee authorizations; and establishes a more comprehensive, systems-based approach to managing designated organizations."

The ODA program was created for the FAA to standardize the operation and oversight of organizational designees.

This program aims to "increase the efficiency with which the FAA appoints and oversees designee organizations, and allow the FAA to concentrate its resources on the most safety-critical matters."

== Types of Organizational Designation Authorizations ==
The following are the different types of Organizational Designation Authorizations for which qualified organizations may apply.

- Type Certification ODA (TC ODA)
- Supplemental Type Certification ODA (STC ODA)
- Production Certification ODA (PC ODA)
- Parts Manufacturer Approval ODA (PMA ODA)
- Technical Standard Order Authorization Holder ODA (TSOA ODA)
- Major Repair, Alteration, and Airworthiness ODA (MRA ODA)
- Airman Knowledge Testing ODA (AKT ODA)
- Air Operator ODA (AO ODA)

== History ==
In the "VISION 100—CENTURY OF AVIATION REAUTHORIZATION ACT" of 2003, legislators passed a section entitled "DESIGN ORGANIZATION CERTIFICATES", which instructed the FAA to deputize designers, so that the designers would "certify compliance with the requirements and minimum standards... for the type certification of aircraft, aircraft engines, propellers, or appliances."

In 2005, the FAA granted Boeing "in-house oversight for new planes in production and approval of major repairs and alterations". The manufacturers’ engineer is delegated to review the design, plan and observe tests, and certify they meet applicable standards. FAA staff do attend "many critical tests involving safety issues — such as flammability of new materials and design of flight controls". The ODA status is granted for an aircraft manufacturer to act as the proxy on certification oversight. Previous to the ODA programme, "engineers in that role were approved by and reported directly to the FAA".

In 2011, Associate Administrator for Aviation Safety Margaret Gilligan issued National Policy Order 8100.15A to establish the "procedures, guidance, and limitations of authority" the FAA grants to an organization under the ODA program. Order 8100.15A was 293 pages long and composed of 16 chapters and seven appendices. The legislative authority for the ODA program was derived under Title 49 of the US Code § 44702: Issuance of Certificates, which authorized the FAA to "delegate to a qualified private person a matter related to issuing certificates, or related to the examination, testing, and inspection necessary to issue a certificate on behalf of the FAA Administrator". The FAA established the ODA program in 14 CFR part 183, subpart D: Representatives of the Administrator.

Boeing has 1,500 people in its ODA, under supervision by an FAA team of 45 people, of which only 24 are engineers. By 2018, the FAA was letting Boeing certify 96 percent of its own work.

=== Historical examples ===
The Boeing 737 series had suffered from rudder issues in the past, resulting in several accidents. A previous model of the 737 also experienced a similar mix of questionable safety assessment, insufficient pilot training, and automated system malfunction when Turkish Airlines Flight 1951 crashed. In February 2020, Boeing and NTSB officials refused to cooperate with a new Dutch lawmakers inquiry.

In November 2019, the online media "The Air Current" reviewed historical parallels between the MAX and the McDonnell Douglas DC-10, which had been grounded after the crash of American Airlines Flight 191. A safety panel was convened by the FAA under the auspices of the National Academy of Sciences to investigate both the design of the DC-10 and the regulatory system itself. In its report, published in June 1980, the safety panel highlighted the FAA's reliance on the manufacturer during the certification process and the fact that in most cases it performs only a "cursory review" of the manufacturer's information. The New York Times noted that the panel found "critical deficiencies in the way the Government certifies the safety of American-built airliners".

For Marian Pistik, head of asset management at International Airfinance Corporation, the case of the MAX is unprecedented due to allegations of wrongdoings. The groundings of the DC-10 and of the Dreamliner could not be directly compared to the global B737 MAX grounding: "there was no suspicion that Boeing or any OEM knew of the problem and tried to disguise it or […] any suspicion of wrongdoing or not being compliant or forthcoming with the issues of the 737 Max."

== Oversight of delegation policies by SOCAC ==
The Safety Oversight and Certification Advisory Committee (SOCAC) was created by the FAA Reauthorization Act of 2018. The committee will provide advice to the Secretary of Transportation on policies related to FAA safety oversight and certification programs and activities, utilization of delegation and designation authorities.

== Controversies ==
The ODA process has been criticized as detrimental to safety. Since 2012, the FAA had successfully pushed to increase the scope of delegating safety checks to the manufacturer.

On 4 February 2013, an article in The Seattle Times written by journalist Kyung Song critiqued the process by which the airworthiness certificate was obtained for the Boeing 787 because approvals for the lithium ion battery system were akin "to the fox guarding the chicken coop". In the words of an onlooker, "Song stated that Boeing became an FAA designee [sic] with wide latitude in picking the company’s own engineers to sign off on their employer’s work on behalf of the FAA".

Executive-summary – Special Committee to Review the FAA's Aircraft Certification Process

Official report – Special Committee to Review the FAA's Aircraft Certification Process

In April 2019, U.S. Secretary of Transportation, Elaine L. Chao, who boarded a MAX flight on March 12 amid calls to ground the aircraft created the Special Committee to Review the FAA's Aircraft Certification Process to review of Organization Designation Authorization, which granted Boeing authority to review systems on behalf of the FAA, during the certification of the 737 MAX 8. The committee recommended integrating human performance factors and consider all levels of pilot experience, but defended the ODA against any reforms. Relatives of those on board the accident flights condemned the report for calling the ODA an "effective" process.

In June 2020, the United States Senate criticized the FAA for failing to turn over 737 MAX documents and accused the FAA of trying "to keep us in the dark". The U.S. Inspector General said that by 2017, Boeing was handling all certification checks on behalf of the FAA.

=== FAA response to criticisms of excessive delegation ===
In response to questions from Project On Government Oversight, a FAA spokesperson said “FAA has never allowed companies to police themselves or self-certify their aircraft. With strict FAA oversight, delegation [of certification] extends the rigor of the FAA certification process to other recognized professionals, thereby multiplying the technical expertise focused on assuring an aircraft meets FAA standards.”

In May 2020, the FAA announced a reform of existing processes to improve management of aircraft development and corporate practices. In June 2020, a Senate Bill calling for changes to the existing ODA was being drafted to resolve potential conflict of interest between Boeing, FAA, designated representatives and whistleblowers. FAA Director Steve Dickenson admitted that "mistakes were made" with the 737 MAX and that the implications of MCAS were not fully understood.

In August 2020, the FAA proposed a $1.2 million fine on Boeing for exerting undue pressure on designated inspectors to expedite aircraft approvals.
