= Ethiopian Airlines Flight 302 =

2019 aviation accident in Ethiopia

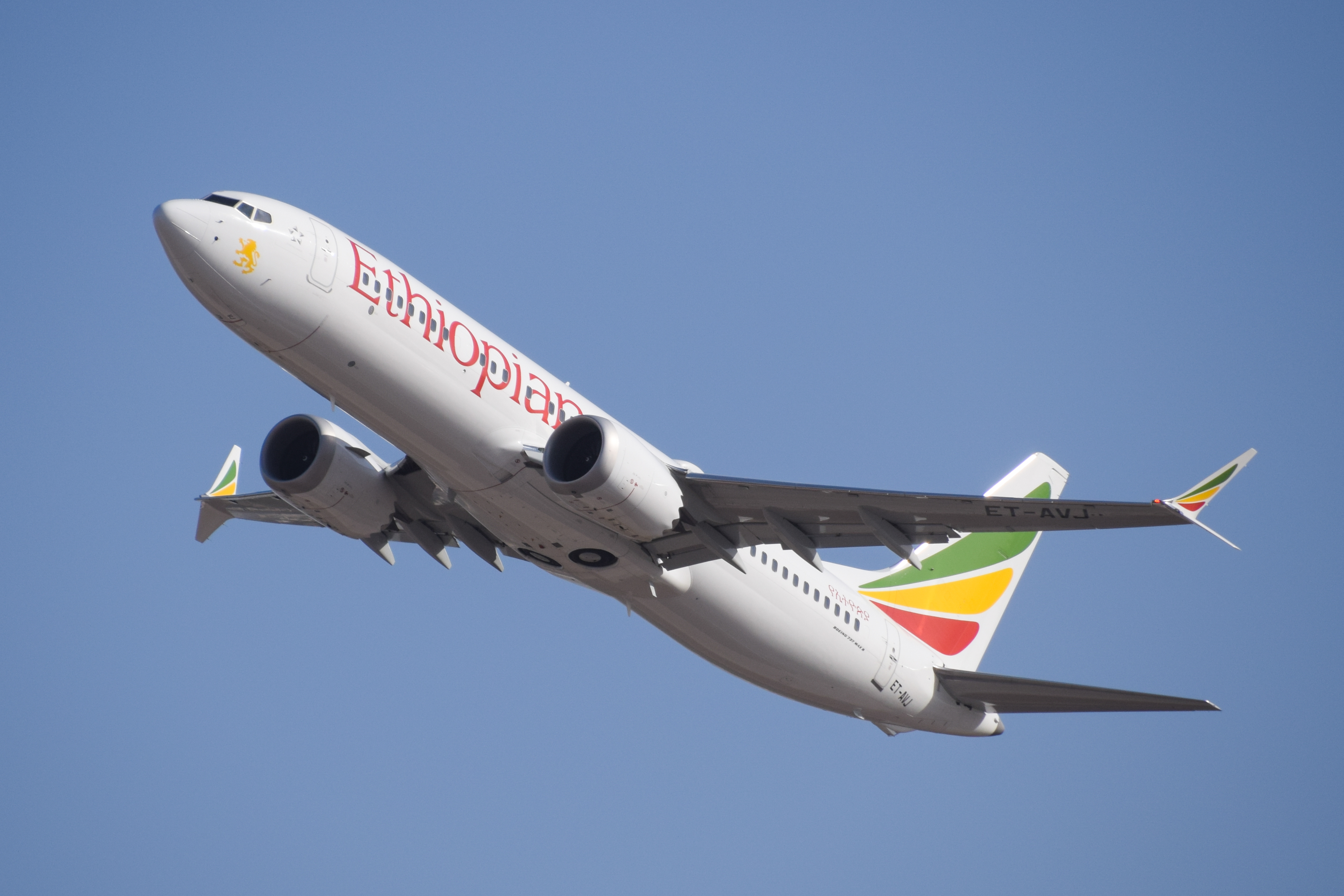
- ET-AVJ, the aircraft involved in the accident, pictured in February 2019

Accident
- Date: 10 March 2019
- Summary: Loss of control in flight
- Site: Bishoftu, near Addis Ababa Bole International Airport, Addis Ababa, Ethiopia; 8°52′37″N 39°15′04″E

Aircraft
- Aircraft type: Boeing 737 MAX 8
- Operator: Ethiopian Airlines
- IATA flight No.: ET302
- ICAO flight No.: ETH302
- Call sign: ETHIOPIAN 302
- Registration: ET-AVJ
- Flight origin: Addis Ababa Bole International Airport, Addis Ababa, Ethiopia
- Destination: Jomo Kenyatta International Airport, Nairobi, Kenya
- Occupants: 157
- Passengers: 149
- Crew: 8
- Fatalities: 157
- Survivors: 0

Ethiopian Airlines Flight 302 was a scheduled international passenger flight from Bole International Airport in Addis Ababa, Ethiopia, to Jomo Kenyatta International Airport in Nairobi, Kenya. On 10 March 2019, the Boeing 737 MAX 8 aircraft which operated the flight crashed near the town of Bishoftu six minutes after takeoff. All 149 passengers and 8 crew members on board died.

It is Ethiopian Airlines' deadliest accident to date, surpassing the fatal hijacking of Ethiopian Airlines Flight 961 resulting in a crash near the Comoros in 1996 that killed 125. It is also the deadliest aircraft accident to occur in Ethiopia, surpassing the crash of an Ethiopian Air Force Antonov An-26 in 1982, which killed 73 people on board.

The crash was caused by a fault in the plane's Maneuvering Characteristics Augmentation System (MCAS), a flight stabilizing system developed by Boeing for the MAX 8. The system had been designed to rely on a single sensor to detect the aircraft's angle of attack. Due to a failure in the sensor, the aircraft's nose was repeatedly pitched down against the pilots' inputs, eventually leading the plane to crash.

The accident was the second involving a MAX 8, and occurred less than five months after the crash of Lion Air Flight 610 in the Java Sea that killed 189, which was later found to have also been caused by MCAS. The crashes prompted a two-year worldwide grounding of the jet and an investigation into how the aircraft was approved for passenger service.

== Aircraft and crew ==
The aircraft was a brand-new Boeing 737 MAX 8, with serial number 62450 and registered as ET-AVJ. It was manufactured by Boeing Commercial Airplanes in 2018 and was delivered to Ethiopian Airlines on 15 November. It had logged 1,330.3 airframe hours in 382 takeoff and landing cycles. It was also powered by two CFM International LEAP-1B28B1G05 engines.

In command was 29-year-old Captain Yared Getachew who had been flying with the airline for almost nine years and had logged a total of 8,122 flight hours, including 4,120 hours on the Boeing 737. (Note: Yared had 4,120 hours on the Boeing 737 regardless of variant, but only 103 hours on the Boeing 737 MAX, while 4,017 hours were on the Boeing 737 Next Generation. Ethiopian names do not have family names, so Ethiopian people are addressed by their given names.) He had been a Boeing 737-800 captain since November 2017; he started flying the Boeing 737 MAX in July 2018. At the time of the accident, he was the youngest captain at the airline. His co-pilot was 25-year-old First Officer Ahmednur Mohammed who was a recent graduate from the airline's academy with 361 flight hours logged, including 207 hours on the Boeing 737. (Note: Ahmednur had 207 hours on the Boeing 737 regardless of variant, but only 56 hours on the Boeing 737 MAX. His remaining 151 hours were on the Boeing 737 Next Generation.)

== Accident ==
Flight 302 was a scheduled international passenger flight from Addis Ababa, Ethiopia, to Nairobi, Kenya. The flight departed Addis Ababa at 08:38:34 local time (05:38:34 UTC) with 149 passengers and 8 crew on board.

Seconds after takeoff at 08:38:44, the left and right angle of attack (AOA) sensors immediately started disagreeing on each other's data. Due to the AOAs' erroneous and unstable data, the left stick shaker immediately activated. The airspeed indicators on both sides also disagreed with each other and the master caution and the anti-ice lights illuminated.

Approximately one minute into the flight, the first officer, following the captain's instructions, retracted the flaps. Within 10 seconds of this action, the autopilot disengaged, and the aircraft started to descend. The captain directed the first officer to report a "flight control" problem to the control tower.

By the second minute, the Maneuvering Characteristics Augmentation System (MCAS) had angled the horizontal stabilizer sharply downward, pitching the aircraft into a dive. Although the pilots managed to briefly counteract the nose-down attitude, the aircraft continued to lose altitude.

The first officer, correctly identifying that they were experiencing a runaway MCAS activation, called out "Stab trim cut-out!" The pilots toggled switches to disable the aircraft's electrical trim tab system, which also deactivated the MCAS software. Unlike previous 737 models, both switches disabled all electrical control of the stabilizer. Without the electric trim system, the other possible way to move the stabilizer is by cranking the trim wheel by hand, but because the stabilizer was located opposite to the elevator, strong aerodynamic forces were acting on it due to the pilots' inadequate thrust management. At the plane's high speed, there was further pressure on the stabilizer. The pilots' attempts to manually crank the stabilizer back into position failed.

Three minutes into the flight, with the aircraft continuing to lose altitude and accelerating beyond its safety limits, the captain instructed the first officer to request permission from air traffic control to return to the airport. Permission was granted, and the air traffic controllers diverted other approaching flights. Following instructions from air traffic control, they turned the aircraft to the east, and it rolled to the right. The right wing came to point down as the turn steepened.

About five minutes into the flight, having struggled to keep the plane's nose from diving further by manually pulling the yoke, the captain turned the electrical trim tab system back on in the hope that it would allow him to put the stabilizer back into neutral trim. However, in turning the trim system back on, he also reactivated the MCAS software, which reactivated nine seconds later and pushed the nose further down. The captain and first officer attempted to raise the nose by manually pulling their yokes, but the aircraft continued to plunge toward the ground, crashing 25 seconds after MCAS was reactivated and 34 seconds after the captain flipped the stab trim switches.

The aircraft disappeared from radar screens and crashed at 08:43:45, about six minutes after takeoff. Flight tracking data showed that the aircraft's altitude and rate of climb and descent were fluctuating. Several witnesses stated the plane trailed "white smoke" and made strange noises before crashing. The aircraft impacted the ground at nearly 700 miles per hour (610 kn; 1,100 km/h). There were no survivors.

It crashed in the district of Gimbichu, Oromia Region, in a farm field near the town of Bishoftu, 62 kilometres (39 mi; 33 nmi) southeast of Bole International Airport. The impact created a crater about 28 metres (92 ft) wide and 40 metres (130 ft) long, and wreckage was driven up to 10 metres (33 ft) deep into the soil. Wreckage was strewn around the field along with personal effects and body parts.

== Emergency response ==
Shortly after the crash, police and a firefighting crew from a nearby Ethiopian Air Force base arrived and extinguished the flames at the crash site. Police cordoned off the site, and Ethiopian Red Cross personnel and air crash investigators moved in. Together with local villagers, they sifted through the wreckage, recovering pieces of the aircraft, personal effects, and human remains. Trucks and excavators were brought in to assist in clearing the crash site. Human remains found were bagged and taken to Bole International Airport for storage in refrigeration units typically used to store roses destined for export, before being taken to St. Paul's Hospital in Addis Ababa for storage pending identification. Personnel from Interpol and Blake Emergency Services, a private British disaster response firm contracted by the Ethiopian government, arrived to gather human tissue for DNA testing, and an Israel Police forensics team also arrived to assist in identifying the remains of the two Israeli victims of the crash. The Chinese railway construction firm CRSG, later joined by another construction firm, CCCC, brought in large scale equipment including excavators and trucks. They recovered both flight recorders on 11 March, with the first being found at 9 am and the second flight recorder found at 1 pm. (Note: East Africa Time) The black boxes were given to Ethiopian Airlines and were sent to Paris for inspection by the BEA, the French aviation accident investigation agency.

== Passengers ==
The airline stated that there were 35 different nationalities among the 157 occupants on board. Crash victim positive identification was announced on 13 September 2019. Nearly a hundred disaster victim identification (DVI) experts from 14 countries supported the Interpol Incident Response Team (IRT) mission.

Passengers by nationality
Nationality	Deaths
Kenya	32
Canada	16
Ethiopia	9 (Note: As stated, this table is passengers only; including the 8-person crew, total fatalities of citizens of Ethiopia is 17)
China	8 (Note: Including one Hong Kong resident)
Italy	8
United States	8
France	7
United Kingdom	7
Egypt	6
Germany	5
India	4
Slovakia	4
Austria	3
Russia	3
Sweden	3
Israel	2
Morocco	2
Poland	2
Spain	2
Belgium	1
Chile	1
Djibouti	1
Indonesia	1
Ireland	1
Mozambique	1
Nepal	1
Nigeria	1
Norway	1
Peru	1
Rwanda	1
Saudi Arabia	1
Serbia	1
Somalia	1
Sudan	1
Togo	1
Uganda	1
Yemen	1
Total	149

Many of the passengers were travelling to Nairobi to attend the fourth session of the United Nations Environment Assembly (UNEP). A total of 22 people affiliated with the United Nations (UN) were killed, including 7 World Food Programme staff, along with staff of the United Nations office in Nairobi, the International Telecommunication Union, and the office of the United Nations High Commissioner for Refugees. The Deputy Director of Communications for the Kenya National Commission for UNESCO, two staff of General Electric, a retired Nigerian diplomat and senior UN official who was working on behalf of UNITAR, and a staff member of the Sudan office of the International Organization for Migration were also among the dead. The airline stated that one passenger had a United Nations laissez-passer. The flight was nicknamed a "UN shuttle" as it connected the African Union headquarters as well as other UN offices in Addis Ababa to the United Nations Office at Nairobi, the organisation's headquarters in Africa. The Addis Ababa-Nairobi route is also popular with tourists and business people. An employee of the Norwegian Red Cross, a British intern with the Norwegian Refugee Council, an environmental agent for the Association of Arctic Expedition Cruise Operators, and four Catholic Relief Services staff were also killed.

Notable victims on-board included the Italian archaeologist and Councillor for Cultural Heritage of Sicily, Sebastiano Tusa, and Nigerian-Canadian academic Pius Adesanmi. Slovak politician Anton Hrnko lost his wife and two children in the crash. Other notable victims included Christine Alalo, a Ugandan police commissioner and peacekeeper serving with the African Union Mission in Somalia.

== Responses ==
Ethiopian prime minister Abiy Ahmed offered his condolences to the families of the victims. Ethiopian Airlines CEO Tewolde Gebremariam visited the accident site, confirmed that there were no survivors and expressed sympathy and condolences. Boeing issued a statement of condolence.

The Ethiopian parliament declared 11 March as a day of national mourning. During the opening of the fourth United Nations Environment Assembly in Nairobi, a minute of silence was observed in sympathy for the victims. President Muhammadu Buhari of Nigeria, in his condolence message on behalf of the government and the people of Nigeria, extended his sincere condolences to Prime Minister Abiy Ahmed of Ethiopia, the people of Ethiopia, Kenya, Canada, China and all other nations who lost citizens in the crash.

On 11 March, the FAA commented that the Boeing 737 MAX 8 model was airworthy. However, due to concerns on the operation of the aircraft, the FAA ordered Boeing to implement design changes, effective by April. It stated that Boeing "plans to update training requirements and flight crew manuals in response to the design change" to the aircraft's MCAS. The changes would also include enhancements to the activation of the MCAS and the angle of attack signal. Boeing stated that the upgrade was developed in response to the Lion Air crash but did not link it to this accident.

On 19 March, the U.S. secretary of transportation, Elaine L. Chao, sent a memo to the U.S. Inspector General asking him to "proceed with an audit to compile an objective and detailed factual history of the activities that resulted in the certification of the Boeing 737 MAX 8 aircraft."

Flight International commented that the accident would likely increase unease about the Boeing 737 MAX felt in the aftermath of the Lion Air Flight 610 accident on 29 October 2018, which similarly occurred shortly after take-off and killed all 189 occupants on board. Boeing shares dropped 11% over the weekend; by 23 March, Boeing had lost more than $40 billion in market value, dropping some 14% since the crash.

=== Groundings ===
After the Ethiopian Airlines crash, China and most other civil aviation authorities grounded the airliner over safety concerns. Other jurisdictions, including the U.S., followed suit as new evidence revealed similarities between both crashes. The groundings were ordered despite Boeing CEO Dennis Muilenburg's public assurances that the airplane was safe and a phone conversation with President Trump in which he "reiterated to the President our position that the MAX aircraft is safe", according to a Boeing statement. In response to increasing domestic and international pressure to take action, the U.S. Federal Aviation Administration (FAA) grounded the aircraft on March 13, 2019, reversing a Continued Airworthiness Notice issued two days prior. About 30 MAX aircraft were flying in U.S. airspace at the time and were allowed to reach their destinations. By March 18, every single Boeing 737 MAX plane (387 in total) had been grounded, which affected 8,600 weekly flights operated by 59 airlines across the globe. Several ferry flights were operated with flaps extended to prevent MCAS activation.

== Investigation ==
The MAX uses an adjustable stabilizer, moved by a jackscrew, to provide the required pitch trim forces. Generic stabilizer illustrated.

The Ethiopian Civil Aviation Authority (ECAA), the agency responsible for investigating civil aviation accidents in Ethiopia, investigated the accident. The aircraft manufacturer, Boeing, stated that it was prepared to work with the United States National Transportation Safety Board (NTSB) and assist Ethiopian Airlines. The United States Federal Aviation Administration (FAA) also assisted in the investigation.

Both the cockpit voice recorder (CVR) and the flight data recorder (FDR) were recovered from the crash site on 11 March. The French Bureau of Enquiry and Analysis for Civil Aviation Safety (BEA) announced that it would analyze the flight recorders from the flight. BEA received the flight recorders on 14 March. On 17 March, Ethiopia's transport minister Dagmawit Moges announced that "the black box has been found in a good condition that enabled us to extract almost all the data inside" and that the preliminary data retrieved from the FDR showed a clear similarity with those of Lion Air Flight 610.

On 13 March 2019, the FAA announced that new evidence found from the crash site and satellite data on Flight 302 suggested that the aircraft might have experienced the same problem Lion Air Flight 610 had faced. Investigators discovered the jackscrew that controlled the pitch angle of the horizontal stabilizer of Flight 302, was in the full "nose down" position. The finding suggested that, at the time of the crash, Flight 302 was configured to dive, similar to Lion Air Flight 610. Due to this finding, some experts in Indonesia suggested that the Indonesian National Transportation Safety Committee (NTSC) should cooperate with Flight 302's investigation team. Later, the NTSC offered assistance to Flight 302's investigation team, stating that the committee and the Indonesian Transportation Ministry would send investigators and representatives from the government to assist with the investigation of the crash.

=== Preliminary report ===
On 4 April 2019, the ECAA released the preliminary report. The preliminary report does not specifically mention the MCAS, but rather states "approximately five seconds after the end of the ANU (aircraft nose up) stabilizer motion, a third instance of AND (aircraft nose down) automatic trim command occurred without any corresponding motion of the stabilizer, which is consistent with the stabilizer trim cutout switches being in the "cutout" position".

Approximately one minute into the flight, an airspeed of 238 knots (441 km/h; 274 mph) was selected. About 12 seconds later, the autopilot disengaged. The preliminary report asserts that the thrust remained at takeoff setting (94% N1) and the throttles did not move for the entire flight. In the next 30 seconds the stabilizer trim moved 4.2 degrees nose down, from 4.6 to 0.4 units. In the next 10 seconds, the trim moved back up to 2.3 units as a result of pilot input. The pilots agreed on executing the stabilizer trim cut-out procedure, cutting power to the trim motor operated by the MCAS.

=== Interim report ===
On 9 March 2020, the ECAA released an interim report. This report stated that the left and right angle of attack (AOA) values deviated by 59°. The AOA disagree message did not appear. The left minimum operating speed and left stick shaker speed was computed to be greater than the maximum operating speed without any invalidity detection. The pitch Flight Director bars disappeared then reappeared with left and right displaying different guidance. The left stick shaker then activated. The nose-down trim was triggered by the MCAS four times. The right over-speed clacker activated. On the third MCAS trigger, there was no corresponding motion of the stabilizer, which is consistent with the stabilizer trim cutout switches being in the "cutout" position at that moment. The MCAS design relied on a single AOA sensor inputs making it vulnerable to undesired activation and unreliable data. The difference training from B737NG to B737 MAX was inadequate.

=== Final report ===
On 23 December 2022, the ECAA released the final report in the crash, which stated:

Repetitive and uncommanded airplane-nose-down inputs from the MCAS due to erroneous AOA input, and its unrecoverable activation system which made the airplane dive with the rate of -33,000 ft/min [−170 m/s] close to the ground was the most probable cause of the accident.

On 27 December 2022, the NTSB released its comments on the accident separately from the final report, saying that the Ethiopian authorities failed to include them in or append them to their report. The NTSB's comments read in part:

Overall, the US team concurs with the EAIB's investigation of the MCAS and related systems and the roles that they played in the accident. However, many operational and human performance issues present in this accident were not fully developed as part of the EAIB investigation. These issues include flight crew performance, crew resource management (CRM), task management, and human-machine interface. It is important for the EAIB's final report to provide a thorough discussion of these relevant issues so that all possible safety lessons can be learned.

The NTSB further detailed:

Appropriate crew management of the event, per the procedures that existed at the time, would have allowed the crew to recover the airplane even when faced with the uncommanded nose-down inputs.

The BEA also submitted comments to the draft final report, in which it disagrees with some aspects of the Ethiopian findings, specifically regarding crew performance. The introduction to the BEA's comments reads in part:

The BEA globally agrees with the analysis of the crew performance for phases 4 and 5 of the accident scenario. However, the BEA considers that some aspects of the analysis of the crew performance in the first phases of the flight are insufficiently developed and could improve the understanding of what could have been done by the crew which could have modified the outcome of the flight.

The report continues in documenting the pilots' errors:

During the accident flight, the flight crew did not make appropriate use of the associated applicable procedures on which he [sic] had received training in the preceding months.

The Captain's attempts to engage AP was in contradiction with the Approach to Stall or Stall Recovery maneuver check list, which was expected to be applied in reaction to the stick shaker activation.

Degradation of the CRM which started immediately after the AOA vane failure and which didn't help the crew take the necessary actions to keep the plane under control although they had received an adequate recurrent training on situations that occurred in the accident flight.

== Reactions to the investigation ==
=== Statements from parties ===
Ethiopian Airlines said the MCAS was "to the best of our knowledge" activated when the aircraft crashed. According to Ethiopian transport minister Dagmawit Moges, the crew "performed all the procedures repeatedly provided by the manufacturer but was not able to control the aircraft". Bjorn Fehrm from Leeham News stated the preliminary report confirms "the Flight Crew followed the procedures prescribed by FAA and Boeing in AD 2018-23-51", released shortly after the Lion Air crash.

On 29 April 2019, Boeing's CEO Dennis Muilenburg said that if "you go through the checklist...it calls out actions that would be taken around power management and pitch management of the airplane. It also refers to the cutout switches, that after an activation that was not pilot-induced, that you would hit the cutout switches. And, in some cases, those procedures were not completely followed".

A data spike in the flight data led to speculations about a bird or other debris hitting the plane as it was taking off, shearing away the airflow sensor. These speculations were dismissed by Ethiopian Airlines, and Chief investigator Amdye Ayalew Fanta stated there was no indication of such damage.

On 25 April 2019, The Aviation Herald submitted 25 questions that have arisen in the aftermath of the accident to the FAA's Flight Standardization Board (FSB) regarding their draft for certification of the Boeing 737 MAX aircraft. Earlier, it stated that a copy of the version of section 2.6 of the Flight Operations Manual, "Operational Irregularities", in use by Ethiopian Airlines at the time of the crash was dated 1 November 2017 and did not include material from the Operator's Bulletin issued by Boeing on 6 November 2018.

=== Expert analysis ===
Based on the preliminary report, The Aviation Herald comes to the conclusion: "Neither of the three crews" (JT-43, JT-610, ET-302) "would have been forced to react under time pressure in order to prevent a crash, [...] without the technical malfunctions [of the angle of attack sensors] and the nose down trim inputs."

According to The Air Current aviation journal and The Seattle Times, the preliminary report shows that while the pilots initially followed the correct procedure to disable runaway trim, they did not complete the checklist fully, and consequently, the recovery effort did not succeed. Pilots have demonstrated in simulators that the trim wheels cannot be moved in severe mis-trim conditions combined with a high airspeed. As the pilots on Flight 302 pulled on the yoke to raise the nose, the aerodynamic forces on the tail's elevator would create an opposing force on the stabilizer trim jackscrew that would prevent the pilots from moving the trim wheel by hand.

The Air Current reported that the resolution for this jammed trim issue was not part of Boeing's then-current 737 manual. The Seattle Times reported that pilots on the 737-200 were trained for this failure, but later models became so reliable that Boeing had dropped mention of this procedure, deeming it no longer necessary for the 737.

Experts theorise that the difficulty to trim made it necessary for the flight crew to release the cutout, and try to use electronic trim in an effort to correct the out-of-trim configuration. According to Bjorn Fehrm (Leeham News) and Peter Lemme, the airplane was flying "at 375kts and MCAS was never designed to trim at these Speed/Altitude combinations".

=== Pilot analysis ===
John Cox, a former 737 pilot and pilots' union safety representative, and Chesley Sullenberger, who successfully ditched US Airways Flight 1549 in the Hudson River, both did flight simulator replications of Flight 302. Cox described the rapid onset of unforeseen events as a "...breeding ground for confusion and task saturation." Sullenberger commented that "Even knowing what was going to happen, I could see how crews would have run out of time and altitude before they could have solved the problems." While defending the pilots' actions, Sullenberger was also highly critical of allowing someone with only 200 hours of flight experience to be first officer.

== In popular culture ==
- The crash of Ethiopian Airlines Flight 302 was mentioned in the 2021 episode "Grounded: Boeing Max 8", of the Canadian-made, internationally distributed documentary series Mayday, and was fully covered in the 2024 episode "Deadly Directive".
- In February 2022, Netflix released Downfall: The Case Against Boeing, a documentary about the Lion Air Flight 610 and Ethiopian Airlines Flight 302 plane crashes.
- In September 2022, Amazon Prime released Flight/Risk, a feature documentary about the two Boeing 737 MAX crashes.
- In 2026, Teboho Edkins directed An Open Field, a documentary short film about the rural Orthodox Tewahedo community living at the crash site. Edkins' brother Max died in the crash.

== See also ==
- Ethiopian Airlines accidents and incidents
- Lion Air Flight 610 – the other Boeing 737 MAX accident which occurred four months prior having similar problems as well.
- Boeing 737 MAX groundings
