= List of exports of Italy =

Note: The data is from 2012 and not the current years

Exports of Italy by product category (2019) Chemical products Transportation Machines Mineral products Plastics and rubbers Metals Foodstuffs Precious metals Textiles Instruments Animal products Vegetable products Paper goods Footwear and headwear Miscellaneous Stone and glass Wood products Animal and vegetable bi-products Animal hides Arts and antiques Weapons

The following is a list of the top thirty exports of Italy. Data is for 2012, in millions of United States dollars, as reported by The Observatory of Economic Complexity.

#	Product	Value
1	Refined Petroleum	25,040
2	Pharmaceuticals	20,159
3	Vehicle parts	12,839
4	Cars	9,587
5	Gold	9,248
6	Valves	8,244
7	Leather footwear	7,145
8	Other Furniture	6,355
9	Jewellery	6,247
10	Wine	6,196
11	Washing and Bottling Machines	5,822
12	Trunks and Cases	5,568
13	Machinery Having Individual Functions	4,874
14	Air pumps	4,789
15	Trucks	4,563
16	Liquid pumps	4,128
17	Tanned Equine and Bovine Hides	3,800
18	Excavation Machinery	3,623
19	Transmissions	3,552
20	Other Heating Machinery	3,500
21	Other Small Iron Pipes	3,316
22	Gas turbines	3,180
23	Insulated wire	3,170
24	Refrigerators	3,129
25	Other Iron Products	2,995
26	Seats	2,904
27	Aircraft parts	2,818
28	Raw Plastic Sheeting	2,760
29	Engine parts	2,734
30	Low-voltage Protection Equipment	2,714
