= List of exports of Bangladesh =

Exports of Bangladesh by product category (2019) Chemical products Transportation Machines Mineral products Plastics and rubbers Metals Foodstuffs Precious metals Textiles Instruments Animal products Vegetable products Paper goods Footwear and headwear Miscellaneous Stone and glass Wood products Animal and vegetable bi-products Animal hides Arts and antiques Weapons

The following is a list of the exports of Bangladesh. Data is for 2024, in millions of United States dollars, as reported by International Trade Centre. Currently the top thirty exports are listed. Total export in 2024 was $58.8 billion dollars.

| # | HSCode | Product | Value ($ million) |
|---|---|---|---|
| 1 | 61 | Knit apparel | 27,925 |
| 2 | 62 | Non-knit apparel | 23,844 |
| 3 | 64 | Footwear | 1,676 |
| 4 | 63 | Textile | 1,144 |
| 5 | 84 | Machinery and mechanical appliances | 825 |
| 6 | 53 | Fabric | 622 |
| 7 | 42 | Leather articles | 585 |
| 8 | 65 | Headgear | 580 |
| 9 | 03 | Seafood | 447 |
| 10 | 67 | Artificial flower, article and hair | 274 |
| 11 | 24 | Tobacco | 208 |
| 12 | 39 | Plastic | 203 |
| 13 | 30 | Pharmaceutical products | 178 |
| 14 | 52 | Cotton | 155 |
| 15 | 99 | Commodities | 144 |
| 16 | 19 | Prepared food | 139 |
| 17 | 95 | Toys and sports equipment | 139 |
| 18 | 15 | Edible oil and fat | 133 |
| 19 | 90 | Optical and Medical devices | 119 |
| 20 | 41 | Raw hides, skins and leather | 117 |
| 21 | 87 | Automobile and automobile parts | 115 |
| 22 | 94 | Furniture | 97 |
| 23 | 27 | Refined petroleum | 86 |
| 24 | 88 | Aircraft parts | 71 |
| 25 | 85 | Electrical machinery | 68 |
| 26 | 28 | Inorganic chemicals | 63 |
| 27 | 74 | Copper | 63 |
| 28 | 08 | Fruit and nuts | 61 |
| 29 | 56 | Wadding, felt and nonwovens | 59 |
| 30 | 72 | Iron and steel | 54 |
