= Alemu Sime =

Ethiopian politician

- አለሙ ስሜ
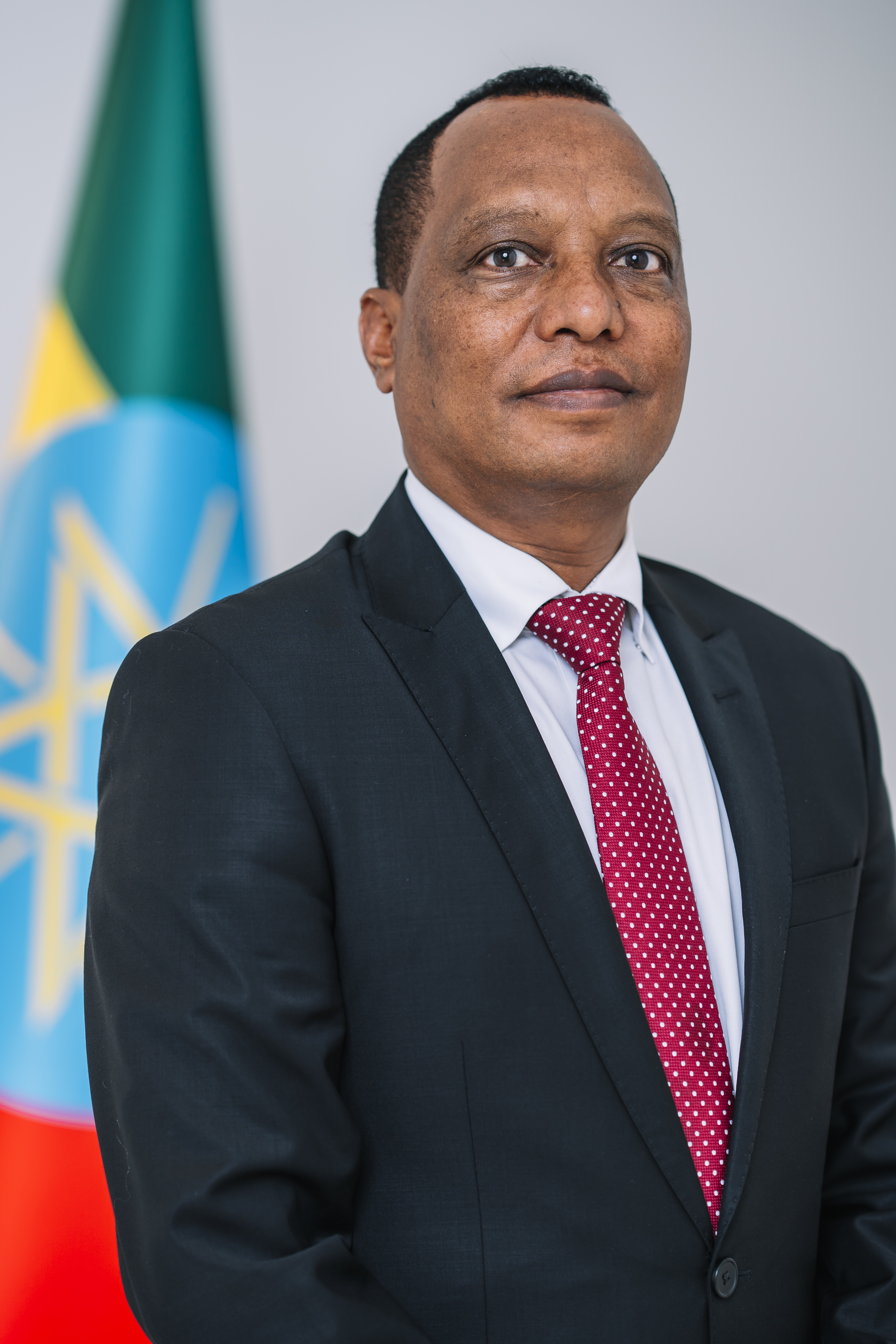

Minister of Transport and Logistics
- Incumbent
- Assumed office 20 January 2023
- Prime Minister: Abiy Ahmed
- Preceded by: Dagmawit Moges

Deputy Director of the Metals and Engineering Corporation
- In office 26 April 2019 – 20 January 2023
- Prime Minister: Abiy Ahmed

Personal details
- Party: Prosperity Party
- Other political affiliations: Oromo Democratic Party; Ethiopian People's Revolutionary Democratic Front

Alemu Sime Feyisa (Amharic: አለሙ ስሜ ፈይሳ) is an Ethiopian politician who has been the Minister of Transport and Logistics since January 2023. Alemu was a deputy director of the Metals and Engineering Corporation (METEC) from 2019 until his ministerial appointment in 2023.

Alemu is currently a member of Prosperity Party and previously the Oromo Democratic Party (ODPO).

== Political positions ==
Alemu Sime was a member of Oromo Democratic Party (ODPO) where he served in secretariat role. On 26 April 2019, Prime Minister Abiy Ahmed appointed Alemu as deputy director of the Metals and Engineering Corporation (METEC). After EPRDF coalition dissolved, Alemu joined the Prosperity Party in 2019. In January 2023, he was elected as Minister of Transport and Logistics, succeeding Dagmawit Moges. On March 12, 2025, Alemu was appointed as a board member of the United Nations Road Safety Fund (UNRSF). He also serves as a member of the House of Peoples' Representatives, representing the Abomsa constituency.
