= Anton Hrnko =

Slovak historian and politician

- Born: 31 January 1955; Žilina
- Occupation: Politician, historian
- Awards: Andrej Hlinka Order Class I (Vladimír Mečiar, President of Slovakia, 1998)
- Website: www.hrnko.sk

Anton Hrnko (born 31 January 1955 in Žilina, Czechoslovakia) is a Slovak historian and politician; a member of the Slovak National Party; and a former member of the National Council of Slovakia.

He was formerly a member of Czechoslovakia's communist party.

On 10 March 2019 his wife Blanka, son Martin and daughter Michala were passengers on Ethiopian Airlines Flight 302, which crashed shortly after take-off, resulting in the deaths of all those on board.

He is a co-author of the book "Slovenské dejiny od úsvitu po súčasnosť" ("Slovak history from dawn to present").

== Works ==
- with Habaj, Michal; Mrva, Ivan (2015). Slovenské dejiny od úsvitu po súčasnosť (in Slovak). Perfekt. ISBN 9788080467302.
