= Supplemental type certificate =

Document of approval for modifications or repairs to an aircraft

A supplemental type certificate (STC) originally issued in 1960 by the Federal Aviation Administration (FAA)

A supplemental type certificate (STC) is a civil aviation authority-approved major modification or repair to an existing type certified aircraft, engine or propeller. As it adds to the existing type certificate, it is deemed "supplemental". In the United States issuance of such certificates is under the purview of the Federal Aviation Administration (FAA).

The determination of whether a proposed change in design, power, thrust, or weight to an existing type certified aircraft, engine, or propeller is acceptable under a STC is proposed by the design holder, and subjected to the approval of the local civil aviation authority. In the case of the USA, for example, that authority is the FAA, and if the FAA finds that the proposed changes are too substantial, a new type certificate will be required under 14 CFR 21.19. In this case, a substantially complete investigation of compliance with the applicable regulations will be required.

== Advantages ==
Some civil aviation authorities also issue Limited or LSTCs that are only applicable to a single aircraft or small number of specific serial numbers.

== Regulation ==
The United States regulations for STCs are found at 14 CFR 21.111.

The European Union regulations for STCs are found Commission Regulation (EU) No 748/2012 of 3 August 2012 as amended, Part-21, Subpart E et seq.

In 2010 at the US/Europe International Aviation Safety Conference, Eurocopter discussed concerns about potential risks with, and incompatibilities in, STCs. In response the Modification and Replacement Parts Association (MARPA) highlighted the success that the Parts Manufacturer Approval (PMA) industry had experienced in implementing Continued Operational Safety (COS) programs for the prediction and proactive addressing of hazards.
