= Ministry of Transport and Communications (Ethiopia) =

Ethiopian government department

Ministry of Transport and Logistics
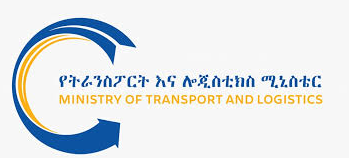

Government department overview
- Formed: 1970
- Jurisdiction: Ethiopian government
- Headquarters: Churchill Ave, Addis Ababa, Ethiopia; 9.020808°N 38.752451°E
- Government department executive: Alemu Sime, Minister of Transport and Logistics
- Website: www.ethiopia.gov.et/ministries/ministry-of-transport/

The Ministry of Transport and Communications is an Ethiopian government department responsible for the oversight of transport and communication sectors in Ethiopia. It was formerly known as the Ministry of Transport. Dagmawit Moges served the ministry from 2018 to 2023. The current minister is Alemu Sime since 20 January 2023.

== History ==
Modern service delivery of transport emerged for the first time during the regime of Emperor Menelik II. After the invading Italian army was driven out of Ethiopia, an office known as "Ministry of Works and Communications" is formed to lead the service of transport and communications by Proclamation No 1/1953 promulgated to define powers and duties of the ministries.

After staying until 1966, the communications sector was detached from this Ministry with order No 46/1966 and established bearing the name "Ministry of Communications". In 1970, the Ministry of Communications, Telecommunication and Post” was established so as to supervise transport and communication services in the centralized manner. Then, in 1974, the name was changed to "Ministry of Communication and post" and after a couple of years (in 1976); it was again renamed "Ministry of Transport and Communications". The ministry merged with the sector of construction and energy and named "Ministry of Infrastructure" in 2001 with Proclamation No 256/2001. Once again it gained its name "Ministry of Transport and Communication" with proclamation No 471/2005.

== Structure ==
After delaying until 2011, the communication sector was detached from the Ministry with order No. 691/2011 and established bearing the name "Ministry of Transport" changed with the supervision and coordination of eleven institutions of transport sectors:

- Ethio-Djibouti Railways
- Ethiopian Airports Enterprise
- Ethiopian Airlines
- Ethiopian Civil Aviation Authority
- Ethiopian Road Transport Authority
- Ethiopian Railway Corporation
- Dry Port Administration
- Maritime Affairs Authority
- Ethiopian Road Authority (ERA):- to be spitted:
- Office of Road Fund Agency
- Insurance Fund office

== Power and duties ==
In its field of activity the Ministry of Transport functions:

- Initiate policies and laws, prepare plans and budgets, and upon approval implement same
- Ensure the enforcement of federal laws
- Undertake study and research, collect, compile and disseminate information
- Provide assistance and advice to Regional States, as necessary
- Enter into contracts and international agreements in accordance with the law
- Direct and coordinate the performance of the executive organs made accountable to it; review their organizational structures, working programs, and budgets, and approve their submission to the appropriate government organs
- Supervise the public enterprises made accountable to it, and ensure that they operate as development catalysts
- Submit periodic performance reports to the prime Minister and the Council of Ministers
- Promote the expansion of transport services
- Ensure that provisions of transport services are in line with the country's development strategy and have equitable regional distribution
- Ensure the integrated provision of transport services;
- Cause the formation and implementation of regulatory frameworks to ensure the provision of reliable and sage transport services
- Regulate maritime and transit services
- Follow-up the activities of the Ethio-Djibouti Railways in accordance with the agreement between the two countries.
- Ensure that transport infrastructures and constructed, upgraded and maintained
