= Dagmawit Moges =

Ethiopian politician (born 1983)

- ዳግማዊት ሞገስ

Director of the Peace Fund Secretariat at the African Union
- Incumbent
- Assumed office 30 March 2023

Minister of Transport and Communications
- In office 16 October 2018 – 14 January 2023
- President: Sahle-Work Zewde
- Prime Minister: Abiy Ahmed
- Preceded by: post established
- Succeeded by: Alemu Sime

Personal details
- Born: 10 December 1983 (age 42) Addis Ababa, Ethiopia
- Party: Prosperity Party
- Other political affiliations: Ethiopian People's Revolutionary Democratic Front; Amhara Democratic Party

Dagmawit Moges Bekele (Amharic: ዳግማዊት ሞገስ በቀለ; born 10 December 1983) is an Ethiopian politician who was Minister of Transport and Communications of Ethiopia from October 2018 to 14 January 2023. Dagmawit became Deputy Mayor of Addis Ababa in July 2018. She began working as AU's Peace Fund Secretariat since March 2023.

== Education and career ==
Dagmawit was studied BA in Public Administration and Development Management (PADM) before working in Addis Ababa University with Graduate Assistant Lecturer. Dagmawit earned MA in Public Management and Policy (MPMP) from the same department and university. Afterward, Dagmawit worked as a general manager of Kolfe Keranio sub-city of Addis Ababa, and served as Micro and small Enterprises Development Bureau Head before serving as a Deputy Bureau head of Addis Ababa City Government Trade and Industry Bureau. She then served as a Deputy Bureau of Addis Ababa City Government Building Bureau.

Dagmawit was a Deputy Mayor since July 2018 and head of the Communication Affairs Bureau of Addis Ababa city, and board chairperson of Addis Ababa Mass Media Agency. During Prime Minister Abiy Ahmed premiership, she was appointed as board chairperson of Ministry of Transportation and Communications from October 2018. The position earned her to several leadership, such as a board member of the Ethiopian Airlines, Ethiopian Petroleum Enterprise and investment board member of Public Partnership (PPP).

Dagmawit became Minister of Transport and Communications in October 2018. On 14 January 2023, Dagmawit left the Ministry position by the approval of the Council of Ministers of Abiy Ahmed, along with the Ministry of Mines and Petroleum Takele Uma Banti.
