= Modification and Replacement Parts Association =

American trade association

The Modification and Replacement Parts Association is the Washington, D.C.-based trade association that represents manufacturers of government-approved aftermarket aircraft parts. These aircraft parts are often known as PMA parts, from the acronym for Parts Manufacturer Approval. The manufacture of PMA parts is regulated in the United States by the Federal Aviation Administration.

== Membership ==
=== PMA parts manufacturers ===
MARPA's primary focus is on representing the needs of the PMA parts community in the United States. These companies manufacture after market aircraft parts under strict FAA guidelines.

In order to obtain a PMA from the FAA, the manufacturer must demonstrate that it has

1. a design for an aircraft part that meets FAA safety requirements, and
2. a quality assurance system that will assure that each part released from the system will meet the FAA-approved design.

The manufacturers that meet these standards are issued Parts Manufacturer Approval (PMA) by the FAA.

Because the United States was the first nation to adopt rules permitting the manufacture of aircraft after market parts (and for many decades was the only nation with these rules), the PMA industry is primarily concentrated in the United States. Other countries have started to investigate and even adopt PMA rules. Some non-US manufacturers have started to investigate the benefits that MARPA can bring to them. In the future, MARPA's manufacturing membership may reflect a more international base.

=== Air carrier involvement ===
MARPA's members include many air carriers from around the world.

MARPA has an air carrier committee that remains quite active. The committee was originally formed by MARPA Director Josh Abelson, and since then has been chaired by Cori Ferguson of Alaska Airlines (2006–2008), David Linebaugh of Delta Air Lines (2008–2011), Steve Jones of American Airlines (2011–2013), William Barrett of American Airlines (2013), Edward Pozzi of United Airlines (2013–2014), Michael Rennick of Delta Air Lines (2014–2017), and is now co-chaired by Deidre Vance of American Airlines (2016–present) and Donald "Donny" Douglas of Delta Air Lines (2017–present). Air carriers engage in a complete engineering review of a PMA part before they choose to install it (despite the fact that the FAA has already approved the part). Despite this engineering review (or perhaps because of it), air carriers have been adopting PMA usage in their fleets and recognizing reliability improvements and cost savings.

== History ==
The industry that MARPA represents, PMA parts manufacturers, is not new. PMA parts have been around as commercial competitors since at least the 1950s. But the popularity of PMA parts has boomed since the turn of the millennium.

MARPA was formed by George Powell, Jim Reum and Jason Dickstein. During the 1990s, the three men were members of the FAA Aviation Rulemaking Advisory Committee (ARAC) Part 21 Working Group, which was charged with developing updated manufacturing regulations. During their work on the working group, the three men came to understand the value of and need for a trade association to represent the interests of the PMA manufacturing community. On May 18, 1998 they held a "MARPA Kick-off Meeting" at Fado Irish Pub on 7th St. in Washington, DC and signed, on a restaurant placemat, an agreement to form such a trade association.

The association spent its early years in the Phoenix, Arizona, area under the guidance of George Powell and his wife Gloria Nations. In 2007, when Jason Dickstein became president, MARPA moved its headquarters to Washington, D.C., in order to be closer to the decision-makers that affect MARPA's members.

MARPA has had three presidents:

President	Term of office
George Powell	(1999–2004)
Gloria Nations	(2004–2007)
Jason Dickstein	(2007–present)

MARPA has had four chairmen of the board:

Chairman	Term of office
Jim Reum	(1999–2004)
Patrick White	(2004–2008)
Joshua Abelson	(2008–2009)
John Hunter	(2009–present)

== Government and industry affairs ==
MARPA keeps its members informed about changes in the regulations that affect them, and also informs them about proposed changes in order to permit them to file the comments with the government. MARPA works with government agencies, like the FAA and EASA, to help promote aircraft parts safety. MARPA also works with the government agencies to help promote reasonable standards of commercial fairness in the industry. MARPA is a frequent contributor to the rule making process in the United States. For example, from 2009 through 2011, MARPA's president (Jason Dickstein) served on the FAA Aviation Rulemaking Committee (ARC) for Safety Management Systems (SMS), and MARPA played a significant role in helping to craft a version of the rule that would most effectively promote safety.

=== Safety initiatives ===
MARPA also develops programs and tools to assist its members in regulatory compliance and in meeting their safety goals. In 2004, the FAA and PMA community discussed establishing new standards for Continued Operational Safety (COS). MARPA formed a committee of its members and drafted COS Guidance. The MARPA COS guidance represents a voluntary system under which PMA manufacturers track their parts through their entire life cycle in order to be able to collect reliability data. The purpose of the data is to support parts reliability – that will allow manufacturers to proactively respond to potential safety issues early enough in the life cycle of the parts that the potential safety issue may not have even manifested itself. The data allows PMA companies to provide the same level of response and support to its customers that their competitors provide.

=== Actions for PMA companies ===
MARPA has been recognized as a trade association committed to helping PMA companies to comply with FAA and other regulations.

MARPA joined with the Air Transport Association in a letter to CFM International, asking them to rescind a series of advertisements that made unsupported claims. Although CFM did not admit to MARPA's and ATA's claims, it did replace its factually-unsupported advertisements with ads that did not make the same allegations.

Fairness remained an issue as some of the larger manufacturers of aircraft products attempted to inhibit trade in PMAs by inaccurately claiming that PMA parts were not subject to the same Instructions for Continued Airworthiness as the parts that they replace. MARPA continued to inform the industry and the government about these issues and in 2008, the FAA released a Special Airworthiness Information Bulletin to remind the industry that PMA parts are FAA-approved in the United States, and therefore PMA parts are valid replacement parts that continue to enjoy the same Instructions for Continued Airworthiness as the parts that they replace.

=== As an educator ===
MARPA has always had an education focus. MARPA has assisted its members in complying with the regulations and developing strategies to obtain PMAs. It also educates the PMA community about the changing standards that apply to them through their website, a monthly newsletter, a blog, and an Annual Conference.

In addition to keeping the PMA industry informed about the changes that surround it, MARPA has also focused on educating PMA users (and potential users) about the benefits of using PMA parts. MARPA's efforts to educate air carriers are credited with a significant decrease in the amount of time that an air carrier needs in order to review and approve a PMA part for use in their fleet.

MARPA also supports member efforts to educate the public about PMA parts.

=== Annual conference ===
MARPA holds an annual conference each year to share information about the rules that apply to PMA, changing legal standards that could influence PMA manufacturers, and industry conditions that affect PMA. There usually one or more analysis of current aviation industry economic conditions and airline market conditions in order to facilitate industry strategic planning. The Conference generally features significant participation by the FAA and other government entities (like EASA, U.S. Air Force, U.S. International Trade Administration, U.S. Justice Department, etc.), which makes it an important forum for exchanging information.

== International focus ==
MARPA is based in the United States and mostly made up of US-based companies because the United States was the first country to have a body of regulations that supported government-approved manufacturing of aftermarket aircraft parts. Other countries have begun to investigate options to support such industries.

The European Aviation Safety Agency has issued a decision verifying that PMA parts from the United States are accepted and used in European Community member countries. This decision followed a long-standing policy of the Joint Aviation Authorities (JAA). The tenets of European acceptance also exist in the bilateral agreements between the United States and a number of European nations.

In 2010, MARPA appeared on a panel at the FAA / EASA International Safety Meeting. The panel also include Eurocopter and both FAA and EASA senior management. The purpose of the panel was to explore the safety paradigms that could be introduced to address the relationships between the aftermarket and the OEM market. MARPA's presentation focused on the Association's initiatives designed to provide a foundation for data gathering, data analysis, predictive risk management, and cooperative hazard mitigation.

MARPA's air carrier and maintenance facility members include a number of non-US parties.
