= Parts Manufacturer Approval =

Approval for parts of aircraft in United States

Parts Manufacturer Approval (PMA) is an approval granted by the United States Federal Aviation Administration (FAA) to a manufacturer of aircraft parts.

== Approval ==
It is generally illegal in the United States to install replacement or modification parts on a certificated aircraft without an airworthiness release such as a Supplemental Type Certificate (STC) or Parts Manufacturer Approval (PMA). There are a number of other methods of compliance, including parts manufactured to government or industry standards, parts manufactured under technical standard order authorization [TSO], owner-/operator-produced parts, experimental aircraft, field approvals, etc.

PMA-holding manufacturers are permitted to make replacement parts for aircraft, even though they are not the original manufacturer of the aircraft. The process is analogous to 'after-market' parts for automobiles, except that the United States aircraft parts production market remains tightly regulated by the FAA.

An applicant for a PMA applies for approval from the FAA. The FAA prioritizes its review of a new application based on its internal process called Project Prioritization.

The FAA Order covering the application for PMA is Order 8110.42 revision D. This document is worded as instructions to the FAA reviewing personnel. An accompanying Advisory Circular (AC) 21.303-4 is intended to address the applicant. 8110.42C addressed both the applicant and the reviewer. Per the order, application for a PMA can be made per the following ways: Identicality in which the applicant attempts to convince the FAA that the PMA part is identical to the OAH (Original Approval Holder) part. Identicality by Licensure is accomplished by providing evidence to the FAA that the applicant has licensed the part data from the OAH. This evidence is usually in the form of an Assist Letter provided to the applicant by the OAH. PMA may also be granted based upon prior approval of an STC . As an example: If an STC were granted to alter an existing aircraft design then that approval would also apply to the parts needed to make that modification. A PMA would be required, however, to manufacture the parts. The last method to obtain a PMA is Test & Computation. This approach consist of one or a combination of both of the following methods: General Analysis and Comparative Analysis. General analysis compares the proposed part to the functional requirements of that part when installed. Comparative Analysis compares the function of the proposed part to the OAH part. As an example: If a PMA application for flight control cables were to show that the PMA part exceeds the pull strength requirements of the aircraft system it is meant for, that is general analysis. To show that it exceeds that of the OAH part is comparative analysis. The modern trend is to use a variety of techniques in combination in order to obtain approval of complicated parts - relying on the techniques that are most accurate and best able to provide the proof of airworthiness desired. The cognizant regional FAA Aircraft Certification Office (ACO) determines if the applicant has shown compliance with all relevant airworthiness regulations and is thus entitled to design approval.

The second step in the application process is to apply to the FAA Manufacturing Inspection Divisional Office (MIDO) to obtain approval of the manufacturing quality assurance system (known as production approval). Production approval will be granted when the FAA is satisfied that the system will not permit parts to leave the system until the parts have been verified to meet the requirements of the approved design, and the system otherwise meets the requirements of the FAA quality system regulations. A Production Approval Holder (PAH) will typically already have satisfied this requirement before PMA application is made.

PMA applications based upon licensure or STC do not require ACO approval (since the data has already been approved) and can go straight to the MIDO.

== History ==
Under the Civil Air Regulations (CARs), the government had the authority to approve aircraft parts in a predecessor to the PMA rules. This authority was found in each of the sets of airworthiness standards published in the Civil Air Regulations. CAR 3.31, for example, permitted the Administrator to approve aircraft parts as early as 1947.

In 1952, the Civil Aeronautics Board adjusted the location of the parts production authority from the ".31" regulations to the ".18" regulations. For example, the CAR 3 authority for modification and replacement parts could be found in section 3.18 after 1952.

In 1955, the Civil Aeronautics Board separated the parts authority out of the airworthiness standards, and placed it in a more general location so that one standard would apply to replacement and modification parts for all different forms of aircraft.

In 1965 CAR 1.55 became Federal Aviation Regulation section 21.303.

The 1965 regulatory change also imposed specific obligations on the PMA holder related to the Fabrication Inspection System.

Amendment 21-38 of Part 21 was published May 26, 1972. This was the next rule change to affect PMAs. This rule eliminated the incorporation by reference of type certification requirements in favor of PMA-specific data submission requirements. This change established the separate process and separate requirements for data that must be submitted by an applicant for a PMA (prior to this there was no explicit distinction between the application data requirements for type certificated products and the data requirements for PMAed articles).

The aircraft parts aftermarket expanded greatly in the 1980s as airlines sought to reduce the costs of spares by finding alternative sources of parts. During this time period, though, many manufacturers failed to obtain PMA approvals from the FAA.

In the 1990s, the FAA engaged in an "Enhanced Enforcement" program that educated the industry about the importance of approval and as a consequence a huge number of parts were approved through formal FAA mechanisms. Under this program, companies that had previously manufactured aircraft parts without PMAs could apply for PMAs in order to bring their manufacturing operations into full compliance with the regulations. This movement brought an explosion of PMA parts to the marketplace.

== 2009 rule change ==
The FAA published a significant revision to the U.S. manufacturing regulations on October 16, 2009. This new rule eliminates some of the legal distinctions between forms of production approval issued by the FAA, which should have the effect of further demonstrating the FAA's support of the quality systems implemented by PMA manufacturers. Specifically, instead of having a separate body of regulations for a PMA Fabrication Inspection System (FIS), as was the case in prior regulations, the PMA regulations now include a cross reference to the 14 C.F.R. § 21.137, which is the regulation defining the elements of a quality system for all production approval holders. In practice, all production approval holders were held to the same production quality standards before the rule change – this will now be more obvious in the FAA's regulations. Accomplishing this harmonization of standards was an important goal of the Modification and Replacement Parts Association (MARPA).

The new rule became effective April 16, 2011. The FAA's FAQ on Part 21 stated that PMA quality systems would be evaluated for compliance by the FAA during certificate management activity after the compliance date of the rule. Today, all FAA production approvals – whether for complete aircraft or for piece parts – rely on a common set of quality assurance system elements. E.g. 14 C.F.R. §§ 21.137 (quality system requirements for production certificates), 21.307 (requiring PMA holders to establish a quality system that meets the requirements of § 21.137), 21.607 (requiring TSOA holders to establish a quality system that meets the requirements of § 21.137).

== Relationship to repair ==
The FAA is also working on new policies concerning parts fabricated in the course of repair. This practice has historically been confused with PMA manufacturing, although the two are actually quite different practices supported by different FAA regulations. Today, FAA Advisory Circular 43.18 provides guidance for the fabrication of parts to be consumed purely during a maintenance operation, and additional guidance is expected to be released in the near future. One of the key features of FAC 43.18 is that it recommends implementation of a quality assurance system quite similar to the fabrication inspection systems that PMA manufacturers are required to have.

== Industry association ==
The trade association representing the PMA industry is the Modification and Replacement Parts Association (MARPA). MARPA works closely with the FAA and other agencies to promote PMA safety.

== Developments outside the United States ==
The United States has Bilateral Aviation Safety Agreements (BASA) with most of its major trading partners, and the standard language of these BASAs requires the trading partner to treat FAA-PMA as an importable aircraft part that is airworthy and eligible for installation on aircraft registered in the importing jurisdiction. This process has been facilitated by the International Air Transport Association (IATA) which has published a book on accepting PMA parts.

Although the PMA industry began in the United States, several countries have begun promoting production of approved aircraft parts within their own borders. These jurisdictions include:

- Australia
- China
- The European Union (which produces them as "EPA Parts")

Other jurisdictions have established PMA regulations and are working with trading partners to achieve acceptance of their PMA industries, and thus should be expected to enter the PMA marketplace in the near future. For example, Japan has PMA regulations and has secured a bilateral agreement with the United States that authorizes the export of these parts to the United States as airworthy aircraft parts.
