= Aircraft part =

Component approved for type-certified aircraft

An aircraft part is an article or component approved for installation on a type-certificated aircraft. Approval for these parts is derived from the jurisdictions of the countries that an aircraft is based. In the United States, the Federal Aviation Administration oversees the approval for these parts under Federal Aviation Regulation Part 21.

== Manufacture of parts ==
=== Production Certificate ===
A production certificate holder may produce parts from the type design that is associated with the production approval. Parts manufactured under a Production Certificate are considered to be "approved parts."

=== Parts Manufacture Approval ===
A Parts Manufacturer Approval, or PMA, is one way to obtain approval to produce replacement or modification parts for installation on a type-certificated product. Such parts are considered to be "approved parts."

=== Technical Standard Order Authorization ===
Parts and assemblies may be produced under a Technical Standard Order Authorization (TSOA). Such parts are considered to be "approved parts."

=== Owner produced parts ===
The FAA permits the aircraft owner or operator to produce replacement parts from scratch (using the original as a template and using the same dimensions and materials), and document it in the logbooks as an "owner-produced part" in accordance with FAR §21.9(a)(5). In doing this, the owner could enlist the aid of an A&P, a machine shop, or anyone certified or uncertified personnel and the part would still qualify as an owner-produced part. This ability is granted by the FAA to aircraft owners/operators, so long as the parts they produce are for installation on their own aircraft and not for sale or for installation on an aircraft they do not own (which would require PMA approval instead). All owner-produced parts must still be considered airworthy, by conforming to the aircraft's type design. An A&P that agrees the owner-produced part is airworthy and that the installation is a considered a "minor repair" can approve the aircraft for return to service.

The FAA will consider a part to be owner-produced (and therefore legal) if the owner is meaningfully involved in its production in any of the following ways:

- Provides the specifications or the part to be duplicated;
- Provides the materials to make the part;
- Provides manufacturing techniques or assembly methods;
- Provides quality assurance; or
- Supervises the manufacture of the part.

== Life limited parts ==
Life limited parts are parts that, as a condition of their type certificate, may not exceed a specified time, or number of operating cycles, in service [Canadian Aviation Regulations/ CAR 101.01]

== Flight critical parts ==
Flight critical parts are usually regulated by the FAA and the European Union. These include, navigation systems, communication systems, traffic collision avoidance system (TCAS), etc.

== Repairable parts ==
Some high value aircraft parts can be repaired using various re-manufacturing processes such as machining, welding, plating, etc. The techniques described in Advisory Circular 43.13-1B are generally used as guidance for repair processes that are not specifically described by the manufacturer.

== Used ==
Low jet fuel prices and new programs delays lead to keeping airliners in service for longer, relying increasingly on used parts: their market will grow from $4.5 billion in 2016 to $7.7 billion in 2026. Demand for aircraft recycling is thus growing with 9,300 retirements in the decade including 4,000 narrowbodies. The most prized are life limited parts from CFM56s and less from IAE V2500s.

== Suspected unapproved parts ==
Suspected unapproved parts are those aeronautical parts that should be deemed unairworthy and are therefore not eligible for installation on an aircraft or another aeronautical product because their design, manufacture or distribution is in conflict with aviation regulations. This means that such a part may not have an approved design, may be manufactured by an unapproved manufacturer, distributed by an unapproved distributor, possibly even taken from scrap aircraft while bypassing mandatory and costly shop inspection and recertification processes. Indicators for an unapproved or bogus part may reach from missing, incomplete or counterfeit certification, missing or manipulated identification plates, physical aspects like surface grain structure, shape, colour, or weight deviating from the removal part, to any indicators of poor workmanship as well as a suspiciously low purchase price. Suspected unapproved parts shall be reported to the national aviation authority.

== Trade Associations Representing the Aircraft Parts Industry ==
Aircraft parts are produced by manufacturers. FAA approved aircraft and aircraft parts manufacturers are represented by the Aerospace Industries Association (commercial aircraft manufacturers), General Aviation Manufacturers Association (general aviation aircraft manufacturers) and Modification and Replacement Parts Association (MARPA) (aircraft parts manufacturers).

The Aeronautical Repair Station Association (ARSA) represents organizations which repair aircraft and parts thereof.

Some aircraft parts are sold by distributors. Distributors of aircraft parts are represented by the Aviation Suppliers Association.
