= Reactions to the Boeing 737 MAX groundings =

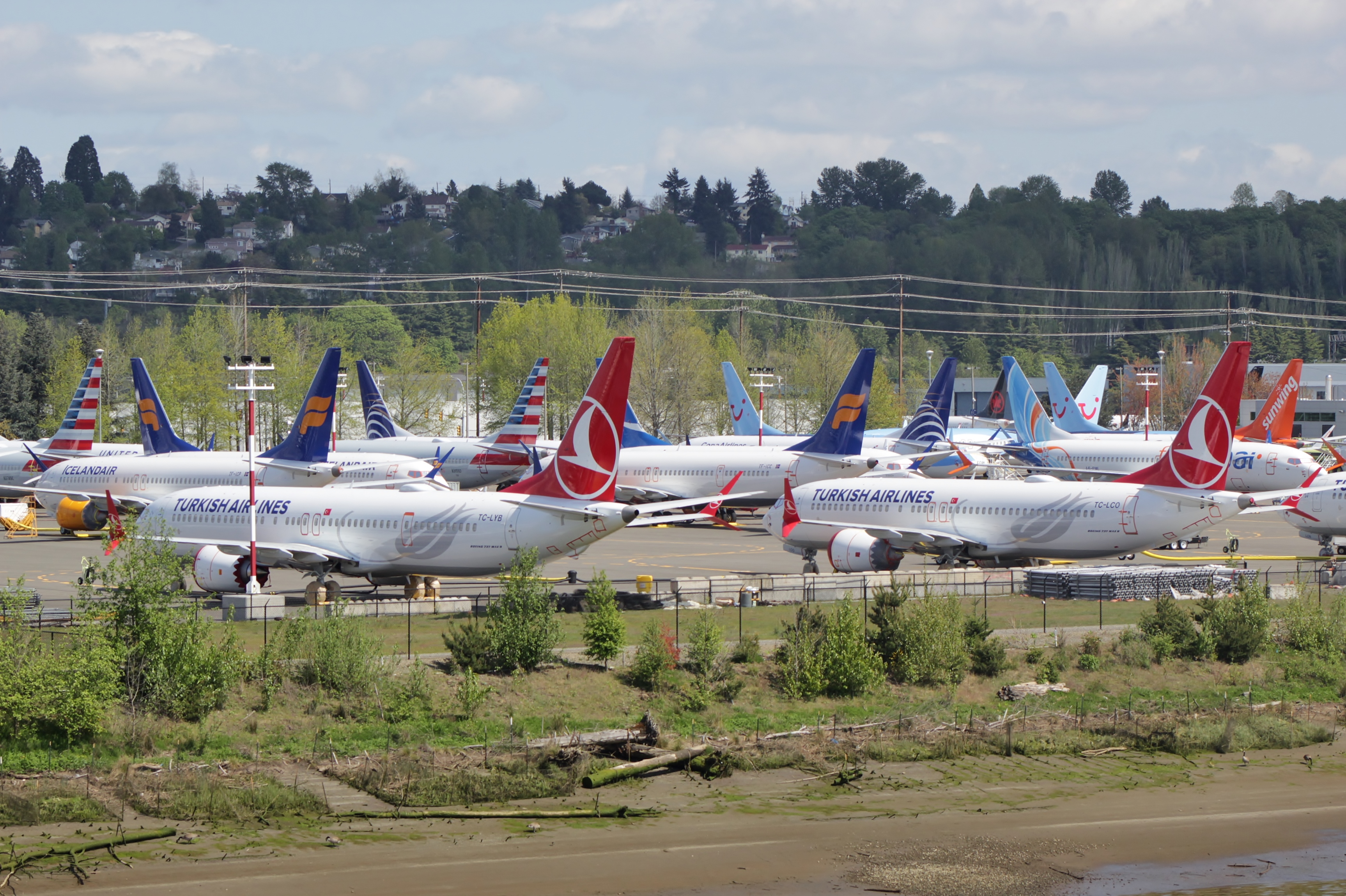
A parking lot at Boeing Field in Seattle filled with grounded Boeing 737 MAX aircraft

The two fatal Boeing 737 MAX crashes in October 2018 and March 2019 which were similar in nature – both aircraft were newly delivered and crashed shortly after takeoff – and the subsequent groundings of the global 737 MAX fleet drew mixed reactions from multiple organizations. Boeing expressed its sympathy to the relatives of the Lion Air Flight 610 and Ethiopian Airlines Flight 302 crash victims, while simultaneously defending the aircraft against any faults and suggesting the pilots had insufficient training, until rebutted by evidence. After the 737 MAX fleet was globally grounded, starting in China with the Civil Aviation Administration of China the day after the second crash, Boeing provided several outdated return-to-service timelines, the earliest of which was "in the coming weeks" after the second crash. On October 11, 2019, David L. Calhoun replaced Dennis Muilenburg as chairman of Boeing, then succeeded Muilenburg's role as chief executive officer in January 2020.

One year after the crashes, lawmakers demanded answers from then-CEO Dennis Muilenburg in a hearing on Capitol Hill. They questioned him about the discovered mistakes leading to the crashes and also about Boeing's subsequent cover-up efforts. One important line of enquiry was how Boeing "tricked" regulators into approving sub-standard pilot training materials, especially the deletion of mentioning the critical flight stabilization system MCAS. A Texas court ruled in October 2022 that the passengers killed in two 737 MAX crashes are legally considered "crime victims", which has consequences concerning possible remedies.

Airbus articulated that the crashes had been a tragedy and that it would never be good for any competitor to see a particular aircraft type having problems. Airbus reiterated that the 737 MAX grounding and backlog would not change the production volume of the competing Airbus A320neo family as these aircraft had already been sold out through 2025 and logistical and supplier capacities could not be easily enhanced short to medium term in this industry.

Pilots' and flight attendants' opinions were mixed, with some expressing confidence in the certification renewal, while others were increasingly disappointed that Boeing had knowingly concealed the existence and the risks of the newly introduced flight stabilization system MCAS to the 737 series as more and more internal information about the development and certification process came to light. Retired pilot Chesley Sullenberger criticized the aircraft design and certification processes and reasoned that relationship between the industry and its regulators had been too "cozy".

Most airlines sought compensation from Boeing to cover costs of the disruption and refrained from ordering new 737 MAX aircraft, while the International Airlines Group (IAG) announced at the June 2019 Paris Air Show it could order 200 jets but reduced this later to 50 firm orders until 2027.

Opinion polls suggested that most passengers were reluctant to fly again aboard the 737 MAX should it be ungrounded.

== Boeing ==
Boeing issued a brief statement after each crash, saying it was "deeply saddened" by the loss of life and offered its "heartfelt sympathies to the families and loved ones" of the passengers and crews. It said it was helping with the Lion Air investigation and sending a technical team to assist in the Ethiopia investigation. Boeing dedicated a fountain adjacent to its aviation museum on its corporate campus in memory of those on board the accident flights.

After the grounding, Boeing suspended 737 MAX deliveries to customers, but continued production at a rate of 52 aircraft per month. In mid-April, the production rate was reduced to 42 aircraft per month. In May 2019, Boeing reported a 56% drop in plane deliveries year on year. In July 2019, after reporting its financial results, Boeing stated that it would consider further reducing or even shutting down production if the grounding lasts longer than expected. On December 15, the Boeing board considered a management proposal to suspend production for several months, until the MAX is cleared by the FAA to return to commercial service. Production was suspended from January 2020, to prioritize the delivery of more than 400 new aircraft from storage bases. Boeing is unlikely to resume its pre-grounding production target of 57 aircraft per month until 2022.

In April 2019, lawyers, analysts and experts criticized Muilenburg's delivery of Boeing's public statements as contradictory and unconvincing. They said Boeing refused to answer tough questions and accept responsibility, defended the airplane design and certification while "promising to fix the plane's software", delayed to ground planes and issue an apology, and yet was quick to assign blame towards pilot error. Muilenburg's handling of the 737 MAX crisis only added to the frustration between Boeing and its stakeholders, resulting in his removal from office in October 2019, as well as the retirement of Boeing's senior legal counsel, J. Michael Luttig.

=== Executive changes ===
On October 11, 2019, Boeing's board removed Dennis Muilenburg as chairman and replaced him with David L. Calhoun, a former boss of GE Aviation. Boeing had resisted earlier calls from shareholder activists to split the roles. Some critics of corporate governance have said that Calhoun is a prime example of "overboarding" due to his multiple positions held concurrently on many boards. On December 23, 2019, the Boeing board had voted unanimously for David Calhoun to replace Dennis Muilenburg as chairman and president effective January 2020. Muilenburg reportedly departed Boeing with stock options and additional assets worth about $80 million, but no severance. Congressman Peter DeFazio, Chair of the House Committee on Transportation and Infrastructure, commented: "Based on what we've discovered so far in our investigation into the design, development and certification of the Boeing 737 MAX, it's clear Dennis Muilenburg's ouster was long overdue. Under his watch, a long-admired company made a number of devastating decisions that suggest profit took priority over safety. Furthermore, reports that Muilenburg attempted to pressure FAA into rushing the MAX back into service are highly troubling and I commend Administrator Dickson for making it known that FAA will take as much time as it needs to ensure safety comes first".

=== Other staff members ===
In July 2019, Boeing announced the retirement of 737 program leader Eric Lindblad, the second person to depart that post in two years. He held the job less than a year, but was not involved in development of the MAX. His predecessor, Scott Campbell, retired in August 2018, amid late deliveries of 737 MAX engines and other components. Lindblad assumed the role shortly before the program became embattled in two accidents and ongoing groundings. He will be succeeded by Mark Jenks, vice president of the Boeing New Midsize Airplane program and previously in charge of the Boeing 787 Dreamliner.

On October 22, Boeing named Stan Deal to succeed Kevin McAllister, who has faced a number of problems beyond the MAX crisis during his three years as president and chief executive of Boeing Commercial Airplanes (BCA).

On December 4, 2019, Boeing Commercial Airplanes announced the retirement of its chief engineer John Hamilton, age 58, who had been appointed as the leader of Boeing's response to the crashes.

On December 26, 2019, Boeing announced that J. Michael Luttig, a senior adviser to Boeing's board of directors and former general counsel for the company, is retiring at the end of 2019. He was one of the highest paid general counsels of publicly traded companies; he helped to establish Boeing's defense over the Lion Air and Ethiopian Airlines crashes.

=== Investigation feedback ===
Between the Ethiopian accident and US groundings, Boeing stated that upgrades to the Maneuvering Characteristics Augmentation System (MCAS) flight control software, cockpit displays, operation manuals and crew training were underway due to findings from the Lion Air crash.

As non-U.S. countries and airlines began grounding the 737 MAX, Boeing stated: "at this point, based on the information available, we do not have any basis to issue new guidance to operators." Boeing said "in light of" the Ethiopian Airlines crash, the company would privatize the roll-out ceremony for the first completed Boeing 777X.

When the FAA grounded the MAX aircraft on March 13, Boeing stated it "continues to have full confidence in the safety of the 737 MAX. However, after consultation with the U.S. Federal Aviation Administration (FAA), the U.S. National Transportation Safety Board (NTSB), and aviation authorities and its customers around the world, Boeing has determined – out of an abundance of caution and in order to reassure the flying public of the aircraft's safety – to recommend to the FAA the temporary suspension of operations of the entire global fleet of 737 MAX aircraft."

Boeing anticipated software deployment before April, and said the upgrade would be made mandatory by an FAA Airworthiness Directive. The FAA stated it anticipated clearing the software update by March 25, 2019, allowing Boeing to distribute it to the grounded fleets. On April 1, the FAA announced the software upgrade was delayed because more work was necessary.

On March 14, Boeing reiterated that pilots can always use manual trim control to override software commands, and that both its Flight Crew Operations Manual and November 6 bulletin offer detailed procedures for handling incorrect angle-of-attack readings.

On April 4, 2019, Boeing CEO Dennis Muilenburg acknowledged that MCAS played a role in both crashes. His comments came in response to public release of preliminary results of the Ethiopian Airlines accident investigation, which suggested pilots performed the recovery procedure. Muilenburg stated it was "apparent that in both flights" MCAS activated due to "erroneous angle of attack information". He said the MCAS software update and additional training and information for pilots would "eliminate the possibility of unintended MCAS activation and prevent an MCAS-related accident from ever happening again". Boeing reported that 96 test flights were flown with the updated software.

In an earnings call that took place on April 24, 2019, Muilenburg said the aircraft was properly designed and certificated, and denied that any "technical slip or gap" existed. He said there were "actions or actions not taken that contributed to the final outcome". On April 29, he claimed that the pilots did not "completely" follow the procedures that Boeing had outlined. He said Boeing was working to make the airplane even safer.

On August 4, 2019, Boeing stated they conducted around 500 test flights with updated software, and Wired reported that one test flight involved multiple altitude changes.

On October 20, 2019, in response to harsh reactions to the publication of Forkner's controversial messages about MCAS simulation during development, Boeing issued a statement about misinterpretations and how it informed the FAA of the expansion of MCAS to low speeds. On December 26, 2019, after the dismissal of Dennis Muilenburg, Boeing turned over to the FAA a new set of "disturbing" messages written in part by Forkner regarding MCAS development. On January 9, 2020, Boeing released the conversation details to the House Transportation Committee, stating that it "regret[s] the content of these communications, and apologize to the [Federal Aviation Administration], Congress, our airline customers, and to the flying public for them."

The House Transportation Committee published a summary of its findings on March 6, 2020. It identified a "culture of concealment" at Boeing and a weak regulatory environment as factors which contributed to the crashes. It acknowledged a wider range of contributory causes, but focused on the MCAS. Boeing's not classifying this as "safety critical", part of its efforts to avoid regulatory oversight and investigation, demonstrated inappropriate influence by Boeing over the FAA, which had then overruled safety concerns flagged by its own experts.

At the same time, the Ethiopian Aircraft Accident Investigation Bureau published a summary of initial conclusions from its own investigation, which suggested that the plane design was the cause of the crashes.

FAA Administrator Dickson defended the omission of MCAS: "The FAA therefore decided to remove the MCAS reference from the draft AD so that flight crews would focus on runaway stabilizer recognition instead of attempting to troubleshoot MCAS". The Committee on Transportation and Infrastructure report cited the strong disagreement of Dr. Mica Endsley, a senior officer at the Human Factors and Ergonomics Society and a former Chief Scientist of the U.S. Air Force, who testified that when MCAS is triggered by incorrect sensor data, the pilot cues are "significantly different than the cues received with a runaway stabilizer trim".

=== Corporate structure and new safety practices ===
Following panel review recommendations, Boeing has strengthened its engineering oversight. As of August 2019, Muilenburg receives weekly reports of potential safety issues from rank-and-file engineers – thousands will report to chief engineers rather than to separate programs, helping them reach senior management more effectively.

In September 2019, The New York Times reported that Boeing board will call for structural changes after the 737 MAX crashes: changing corporate reporting structures, a new safety group, future plane cockpits designed for new pilots with less training. The committee, established in April, did not investigate the Max crashes, but produced the first findings for a reform of Boeing's internal structures since then. It will recommend that engineers report to the chief engineer rather than business management, to avoid pressure from business leaders against engineers who identify safety issues. The committee found that inter-group communication was lacking within engineering and between the Seattle offices and corporate headquarters during the certification work. The safety group will ensure information is shared and the certification work is independent. The group will report to senior leadership and a new permanent committee on the board.

The board said in September that Boeing should also work with airlines to "re-examine assumptions around flight deck design and operation" and recommend pilot training criteria beyond traditional training programs "where warranted".

=== Current and former employees ===
In May 2019, engineers said that Boeing pushed to limit safety testing to accelerate planes certification, including 737 MAX. FAA said it has "received no whistleblower complaints or any other reports ... alleging pressure to speed up 737 MAX certification." Former engineers at Boeing blamed company executives of cost-cutting, over more than a decade, yielding to low morale and reduced engineering staffing, which "they argue contributed to two recent deadly crashes involving Boeing 737 Max jets."

In June 2019, Boeing's software development practices came under criticism from current and former engineers. Software development work for the MAX was reportedly complicated by Boeing's decision to outsource work to lower-paid contractors though these contractors did not work on MCAS or the AoA disagree alert. Management pressure to limit changes that might introduce extra time or cost was also highlighted.

In December 2019, former Boeing manager Ed Pierson testified to Congress that he had previously alerted the Boeing leadership before the second crash that the 737 Max factory was unsafe. He did not report concerns about MCAS, but rather an unsafe working environment and a workforce that was critically overworked that could lead to critical mistakes. According to Pierson, Boeing had ramped up monthly production to the point where some employees were working seven days a week for weeks on end. This harried process led to parts being installed out of sequence and debris being left in aircraft. This increased risk for human error became so apparent that Pierson sent an email to the chief of the 737 program stating "for the first time in my life, I'm sorry to say that I'm hesitant about putting my family on a Boeing airplane." The day before Pierson testified, NBC Nightly News aired an interview with Pierson revealing the whistleblower's repeated attempts to contact Boeing executives and the FAA. In January 2021, Pierson raised further safety concerns and published a new report in which he claims that quality problems at the Renton plant and electrical issues have not been satisfactorily investigated. Pierson has described his decision to come forward as a whistleblower in ethical terms: "Exposing systemic threats to aviation safety wasn’t a choice—it was a moral obligation."

Boeing's former Chief Technical pilot Mark Forkner has invoked the Fifth Amendment right against self-incrimination, to avoid submitting documents to federal prosecutors investigating the crashes. He managed pilots in the Flight Technical and Safety group within Boeing's customer services division. On October 17, Boeing turned over some 10 pages of Forkner's correspondence showing concern with MCAS in simulator sessions in 2016. The next day, FAA Administrator Dickson, in a strongly worded letter, ordered Muilenburg to give an "immediate" explanation for delaying disclosure of these documents for months.

== Airbus ==
In May 2019, executives of Airbus told reporters they do not view the relationship between Boeing and the FAA as having been corrupted. They compared the EASA and the FAA, saying "EASA has a slightly different mandate than the FAA. EASA is a purely safety orientated agency." Airbus Chief Commercial Officer Christian Scherer did not feel the 737 MAX is a variant that has stretched the original 737 too far: "The MAX is not one stretch too many, in my humble opinion". Airbus leader Remi Maillard stated: "We work hand in hand with the regulators, and with the OEMs to adopt the safety standards. But, to be clear, our internal safety standards are even more stringent than what is required by the regulators". Scherer remarked on the way manufacturers can learn from accidents: "Whenever there is an accident out there, the first question that gets asked in an Airbus management meeting is: can we learn from it?"

On April 30, 2019, Airbus CEO Guillaume Faury said the 737 MAX grounding "is not changing the mid- to long-term picture" as "[Airbus is] limited by the supply chain": it should reach a monthly A320 production rate of 60 by mid-2019 before 63 in 2021 while Boeing reduced MAX monthly output to 42 from 52.

On November 17, 2019, at the Dubai Air Show, Airbus Chief Commercial Officer, Christian Scherer, firmly rejected the notion that Airbus was benefiting from the grounding of Boeing 737 MAX. Speaking to CNBC, he said, "I really need to correct that cultural belief. This does not benefit anyone in this industry, the least of which would be Airbus. It's a tragedy, it is an issue for Boeing to resolve, but it is not good for competitors to see problems on any one particular airplane type."

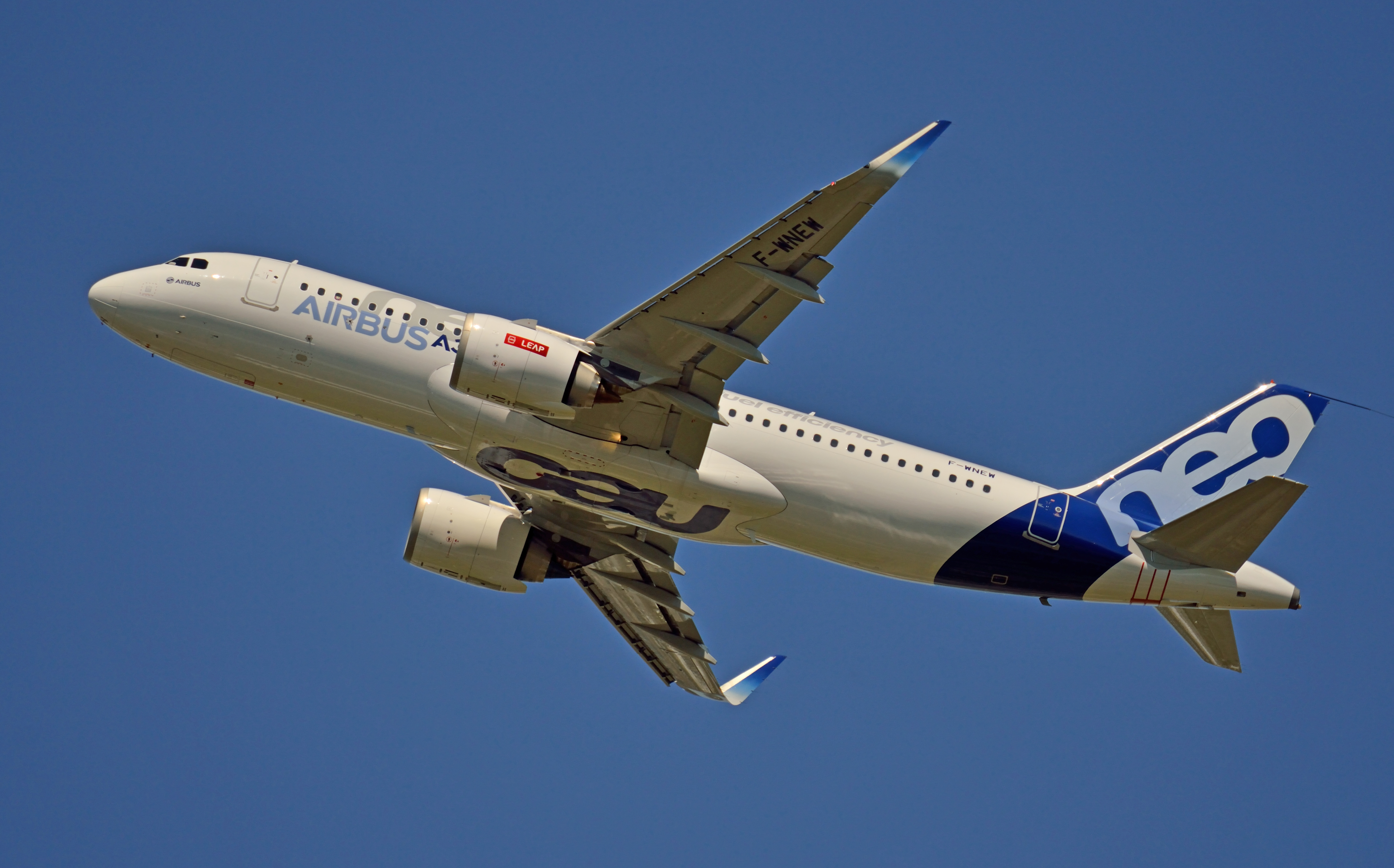
Airbus A320neo prototype with CFM LEAP-1A engines

The 737 MAX's primary competitor is Airbus's bestseller aircraft, the A320neo. The A320neo continued to win orders in the wake of the Boeing 737 MAX grounding, booking over US$11 billion in orders, with additional orders from airlines that are either canceling their 737 MAX orders altogether, or reducing quantities. However, Airbus cannot take advantage of the situation because the A320's production slots are limited. The Airbus A320's backlog is sold out through 2025.

Deliveries for the A320 family and the Boeing 737 series have been as follows:

- Airbus A320 family deliveries
- Boeing 737 series deliveries

The A320neo and the 737 MAX both use engines from the CFM LEAP family, with different thrust requirements. After EASA issued an airworthiness directive regarding potential excess pitch during specific maneuvers, Airbus made a preemptive change to the A320neo flight manual to protect the aircraft in such situations. In response to the EASA recommendations, Lufthansa temporarily blocked the rearmost row of seats until a flight computer update increases the effectiveness of the aircraft's AoA protection.

== Flight crew ==
U.S. labor unions representing pilots and flight attendants had different opinions on whether or not to ground the aircraft. Two flight attendant unions, AFA and the APFA, favored groundings, while pilot unions such as the Southwest Airlines Pilots Association, APA, and ALPA, expressed confidence in continued operation of the aircraft.

=== Cockpit crew ===
In a private meeting on November 27, 2018, American Airlines pilots pressed Boeing managers to develop an urgent fix for MCAS and suggested that the FAA require a safety review which in turn could have grounded the airplanes. A recording of the meeting revealed pilots' anger that they were not informed about MCAS. One pilot was heard saying, "We flat out deserve to know what is on our airplanes." Another US pilot asked for more training prior to his first flight on the 737 MAX several months before the first crash of Lion Air Flight 610. Afterwards, in June 2019, the American Airlines pilot union openly criticized Boeing for not fully explaining the existence or operation of MCAS: "However, at APA we remained concerned about whether the new training protocol, materials and method of instruction suggested by Boeing are adequate to ensure that pilots across the globe flying the MAX fleet can do so in absolute complete safety". Boeing vice president Mike Sinnett explained that the company did not want to make changes in a rush, because of uncertainty whether the Lion Air accident was related to MCAS. Sinnett said Boeing expected pilots to be able to handle any control problems.

The U.S. Aviation Safety Reporting System received messages about the 737 MAX from U.S. pilots in November 2018, including one from a captain who expressed concern that systems such as the MCAS are not fully described in the aircraft flight manual. Captain Mike Michaelis, chairman of the safety committee of the Allied Pilots Association at American Airlines said "It's pretty asinine for them to put a system on an airplane and not tell the pilots … especially when it deals with flight controls".

U.S. pilots also complained about the way the 737 MAX performed, including claims of problems similar to those reported about the Lion Air crash. Pilots of at least two U.S. flights in 2018, reported the nose of the 737 MAX pitched down suddenly when they engaged the autopilot. The FAA stated in response that "Some of the reports reference possible issues with the autopilot/autothrottle, which is a separate system from MCAS, and/or acknowledge the problems could have been due to pilot error."

On October 7, 2019, Southwest Airlines pilots sued Boeing declaring that Boeing misled the pilot union about the plane adding that the planes' grounding cost its pilots more than $100 million in lost income, which Southwest labor union wants Boeing to pay. The head of the Southwest Airlines Pilots Association (SWAPA), Jon Weaks, said in a note to pilots on November 13, 2019, that "Boeing is increasingly publicizing that they may have to shut down their production line due to running out of room to store completed MAX aircraft. There is some concern that this is simply another tactic to push the (return to service) timeline up."

=== Cabin crew ===
In a letter dated October 30, 2019, to Boeing's CEO, American Airlines' Association of Professional Flight Attendants President Lori Bassani wrote: "The 28,000 flight attendants working for American Airlines refuse to walk onto a plane that may not be safe and are calling for the highest possible safety standards to avoid another tragedy." She also met with dozens of elected officials in Washington after the congressional testimony of Boeing's CEO.

Flight crew unions at Air Canada, Sunwing and WestJet support the American flight attendant unions who expressed safety concerns about the MAX return. Sections of the Canadian Union of Public Employees called on Transport Canada to take its responsibility in ensuring a safe return of these planes in the air.

In November, the president of the Association of Flight Attendants-CWA, which represents employees at United Airlines Holdings, said: "We're not good with that, … If we're not confident it's safe, we're not going to work it and the planes don't fly. We've been clear with the FAA, the airlines and with Boeing that we need to see that – we need to see EASA, Canada, Australia, on board. We need all these assurances because there was a break in public trust here." The AFA-CWA represents 50,000 flight attendants at 20 carriers, including United Airlines and Alaska Air Group.

== Public ==
A March 2019 poll suggested that 53% of American adults would not want to fly on a 737 MAX plane if the aircraft were to be cleared by the FAA the following week. In July, Southwest Airlines reprinted aircraft safety cards that were shared between the MAX and the rest of the Southwest 737-800 fleet. An IBD/TIPP Poll surveying Americans in January 2020, found that among the 61% who are closely following news of the MAX, 56% would avoid flying on it once it has reentered service.

Investment company UBS does not "anticipate significant share erosion" as it ran a public poll run showing 8% of the U.S. flying public would never fly the 737 MAX, (dropping to 3% when including that two-thirds seldom or never check the aircraft type before booking a flight), while 60% would fly it after at least six months of safe operations and a tenth would fly it after one to three months, not mattering much as airliner procurement time-frames are five to ten-plus years. The survey found that 70% would hesitate today to book a flight on the MAX.

A study for Atmosphere Research Group, led by consultant Henry Harteveldt, of U.S. passengers between April 27 to May 1 shown that within six months of its return, 14% would definitely fly on a MAX, at least 20% say they will definitely avoid the plane and over 40% said they'd be willing to take pricier or less convenient flights to stay off the MAX.

Various strategies to reinstate public confidence into the MAX are being proposed.

On September 12, 2019, Boeing started an advertisement campaign, in which employees praise its planes' safety. Information packages for travelers about the safety of the redesigned MAX are being prepared by Boeing with the support of airlines. Boeing also produced video capsules showing support from chief pilot Jennifer Henderson.

For Marian Pistik, head of asset management at International Airfinance Corporation, the case of the MAX is unprecedented due to allegations of wrongdoings. The groundings of the DC-10 and of the Dreamliner could not be directly compared to the global Boeing 737 MAX grounding: "there was no suspicion that Boeing or any OEM knew of the problem and tried to disguise it or […] any suspicion of wrongdoing or not being compliant or forthcoming with the issues of the 737 Max."

In November 2020, when the FAA ungrounded the 737 MAX, families and friends of the victims criticized the FAA and Boeing, saying that the process was "rushed" and that the Ethiopian Airlines Flight 302 crash was still under investigation.

== Airlines ==
In October 2018, after the crash but before the groundings, Lion Air had replaced its technical director, and the technicians who cleared the flight. Because the groundings made the aircraft unavailable for service, airlines were forced to cancel thousands of flights, hundreds every day. American Airlines was the first U.S. airline to cancel a route when it stopped service from Dallas, Texas to Oakland, California.

On July 26, Southwest announced it would stop operations out of Newark Liberty International Airport due to the groundings. It removed the MAX name from safety cards for the 737NG to address customer complaints.

In May 2019, United Airlines' CEO Oscar Muñoz said that passengers would still feel uncertain about flying on a Boeing 737 MAX even after the software update. United announced the cancellation of a route between Chicago, Illinois and Leon, Mexico. On October 16, 2019, Muñoz stated that "nobody knows" when the plane will fly again.

Ethiopian Airlines said "These tragedies continue to weigh heavily on our hearts and minds, and we extend our sympathies to the loved ones of the passengers and crew on board Lion Air Flight 610 and Ethiopian Airlines Flight 302". The CEO also pushed back and rejected the notion that his airlines pilots were not fully trained or experienced, a notion intimated in the US House of Representatives in a recent hearing by the FAA director. Ethiopian Airlines rejects the accusation of piloting error. He said: "As far as the training is concerned ... we've gone according to the Boeing recommendation and FAA-approved one. We are not expected to speculate or to imagine something that doesn't exist at all". In June, Ethiopian Airlines CEO Tewolde Gebremariam expressed his confidence in the process for bringing the MAX back into service, and expected Ethiopian to be the last carrier to resume flights.

Ethiopian Airlines' ex-chief engineer filed a whistleblower complaint to the regulators about alleged corruption in Ethiopian Airlines. He is also seeking asylum in the U.S. He said that, a day after the Flight 302 crash, the carrier altered maintenance records of a Boeing 737 MAX aircraft. He submits that the alteration was part of a generalized culture of corruption "that included fabricating documents, signing off on shoddy repairs and even beating those who got out of line".

In March 2019, RT reported the indefinite suspension of contracts for the purchase by Russian airlines of dozens of aircraft, including Aeroflot's Pobeda subsidiary, S7 Airlines, Ural Airlines and UTair. Vitaly Savelyev, Aeroflot's CEO, said that "the company would refuse operating MAX planes ordered by Pobeda".

On June 18, International Airlines Group (IAG) announced plans for a fleet comprising 200 Boeing 737 MAX jets. Boeing and IAG signed a letter of intent at the Paris Air Show valued at a list price of over US$24 billion.

Bjorn Kjos, ex-CEO of Norwegian Air Shuttle who stepped down in July, stated in July that the company "has a huge appetite for 737 MAX jets", according to a report from American City Business Journals. He had said: "It is quite obvious that we will not take the cost... We will send this bill to those who produced this aircraft."

In mid-July, Ryanair warned that some of its bases would be subject to short-term closures in 2020, due to the shortfall in MAX deliveries, and pointed out that the MAX 200 version it has ordered will require separate certification expected to take a further two months after the MAX returns to service. By the end of July, Ryanair CEO Michael O'Leary expressed further concerns and frustration with the delays and revealed that, in parallel with discussions with Boeing regarding a potential order for new aircraft to be delivered from 2023, he was also talking to Airbus which was offering very aggressive pricing. In February 2020, O'Leary revealed that Ryanair has an offer "on the table" for an order of 230-seat MAX 10s, and expected to be "at the head of the queue" once Boeing is in a position to sign new purchases.

== Observers ==
=== Pilot authors ===
Retired airline captain Chesley Sullenberger, who gained fame in the Miracle on the Hudson accident in 2009, said, "These crashes are demonstrable evidence that our current system of aircraft design and certification has failed us. These accidents should never have happened." He sharply criticized Boeing and the FAA, saying they "have been found wanting in this ugly saga". He said the overly "cozy relationship" between the aviation industry and government was seen when the Boeing CEO "reached out to the U.S. President to try to keep the 737 MAX 8 from being grounded." He also lamented understaffing and underfunding of the FAA. "Good business means that it is always better and cheaper to do it right instead of doing it wrong and trying to repair the damage after the fact, and when lives are lost, there is no way to repair the damage."

Author, journalist, and pilot William Langewiesche wrote his first article in The New York Times Magazine, saying: "What we had in the two downed airplanes was a textbook failure of airmanship." To which, another aviation author, Christine Negroni wrote back "the argument that more competent pilots could have handled the problem is not knowable to Langewiesche and it misses the most basic tenet of air safety anyway." She explains that an accident investigation is not about blame, is not only about what happened, but rather strives to identify the root causes. The counterpoint's essence is that Langewiesche downplays the "failure of systems and processes that put a deeply flawed airplane in the hands of pilots around the world". Captain Chesley Sullenberger also replied to the paper by a letter to the editors, in which he says: "I have long stated, as he does note, that pilots must be capable of absolute mastery of the aircraft and the situation at all times, a concept pilots call airmanship. Inadequate pilot training and insufficient pilot experience are problems worldwide, but they do not excuse the fatally flawed design of the Maneuvering Characteristics Augmentation System (MCAS) that was a death trap."

=== Former NTSB members ===
On March 12, 2019, Jim Hall, a former chairman of the National Transportation Safety Board (NTSB), the U.S. agency that investigates airplane crashes, said the FAA should ground the airplane. Engineering experts have pointed out misconceptions of the general public and media concerning the 737 MAX characteristics and the crashes. Andrew Skow, a former Northrop Grumman chief engineer, assessed Boeing as having good track record modernizing of the 737, but, "They may have pushed it too far."

Peter Goelz, a former managing director of the NTSB, said: "One of the ways Boeing marketed the 737 Max was the modest amount of training up for current 737 pilots. You didn't have to go back to the Sim [the flight simulator] again and again." James E. (Jim) Hall, chairman of the NTSB from 1994 to 2001, blamed the FAA regulators for giving too much power to the airline industry. In July, Hall and Goelz co-signed an opinion letter to The New York Times, in which they said: "Boeing has found a willing partner in the FAA, which allowed the company to circumvent standard certification processes so it could sell aircraft more quickly. Boeing's inadequate regard for safety and the FAA's complicity display an unconscionable lack of leadership at both organizations." The letter went on to compare the current crisis with Boeing's handling of Boeing 737 rudder issues in the 1990s. In January 2020, Hall, said in an interview on CNBC: "... we had the example this week of the 2009 Turkish accident where it had similarities that should have been picked up immediately when they had problems with the 737 MAX so it makes you wonder what do they know about safety. Does the right hand know what the left hand is doing? Are these comments that were made and distributed by the employees about the dysfunction still in existence?"

John Goglia, former member of the NTSB, criticized Boeing and the FAA for not protecting FAA-designated oversight engineers from Boeing management pressure. Commenting on the 2016 removal of a senior engineer who had insisted on improved testing of a fire suppression system, he said that management action of this kind produces a chilling effect on others and "negates the whole system." He also criticized Congress for pushing the FAA to delegate even more to the industry, as it passed the 2018 FAA Reauthorization Act, which mandated further expansion of the Organization Delegation Authorization (ODA) program. "Apparently, Congress didn't think the FAA was delegating enough to ODA holders. [...] many of its members are also accepting campaign donations from aircraft manufacturers, such as Boeing, which clearly have an interest in pushing the FAA to delegate more and more authority to manufacturers with as little oversight as possible".

=== Consumer advocates ===
In May 2019, the consumer advocate organization Flyers Rights opposed the FAA's position of not requiring simulator training for 737 MAX pilots. It also asked to extend the comment period to allow independent experts to "share their expertise with the FAA and Boeing". In December 2019, Flyers Rights sued the FAA for its refusal to allow access to the Boeing 737 MAX records. The organization argues for transparency and independent review prior to ungrounding the MAX. It is supported by aviation professionals including Chesley Sullenberger, Michael Goldfarb, an aviation safety consultant and former chief of staff and senior policy adviser to the FAA Administrator, and several other experts.

In June 2019, consumer advocate Ralph Nader, who lost a grandniece in one of the accidents, claimed that the Boeing 737 "must never fly again... it's not a matter of software. It's a matter of structural design defect: the plane's engines are too much for the traditional fuselage". Nader also called for Boeing top leaders to resign. In October, Nader called for the replacement of Muilenburg and the complete board of directors as the crisis grows, saying: " They don't want to admit that they really, really performed in a very seriously adverse way to the safety of airline passengers". On December 13, 2019, he appealed to Canada's Prime Minister Justin Trudeau to not rely on FAA's decision for ungrounding the MAX, but that Transport Canada do their own independent decision: "Obviously the Canadian decision is very important. It's not likely that the FAA will unground the plane unless Canada goes along...We're relying on Canada here … The FAA will not go without Canada". Nader was interviewed on Democracy Now! and covered the safety concerns on his own program, the Ralph Nader Radio Hour.

=== Business analysts ===
The 737 MAX grounding has drawn historical comparisons with the DC-10 in 1979 and Boeing 787 in 2013. Marian Pistik, head of asset management at International Airfinance Corporation said that in either case, "there was no suspicion that Boeing or any OEM knew of the problem and tried to disguise it, or any suspicion of wrongdoing or not being compliant or forthcoming with the issues of the 737 Max."

In September, aerospace analyst Richard Aboulafia said about Boeing: "This is an engineering company, it needs an engineering culture and engineering management; it deviated pretty far from this at the time when the MAX was being developed."

In December 2019, he wrote: "Calhoun is replacing Dennis Muilenburg because the latter CEO's year has been disastrous. The company's communications with Congress, the FAA, international regulators, airline and lessor customers, suppliers, the victims' families, and pretty much the entire outside world were a master class in bad crisis management." He added in January 2020: "It's no longer about MCAS. It's about things that might be discovered.[...] This is going to be the most scrutinized certification in history."

About Boeing's internal employee emails released in January 2020, travel industry analyst Henry Harteveldt said: "Not only do they further weaken confidence in the 737 Max, they also paint a pretty caustic picture of Boeing and its culture itself. There's the potential that it could cause some people to be concerned about flying on Boeing airplanes, period.''

=== Academia ===
In Harvard Business Review, Amy C. Edmondson writes that Boeing needs a full organizational culture change. "But how telling it is that it takes a cataclysmic event (two, actually) for executives to take culture seriously?"

MIT Sloan senior lecturer Neal Hartman was cited in MIT ideas: "The toxic tone of some of the emails suggests that there are numerous problems at Boeing. [...] Of greatest concern is the fear that employees were either uncomfortable or not empowered – or both – to take their concerns to appropriate levels in the company."

Yale University senior associate dean Jeffrey Sonnenfeld went as far as to say that the groundings could become an existential threat to Boeing.

Rosabeth Moss Kanter, the Arbuckle Professor at Harvard Business School wrote: "Boeing's new CEO and leadership team must root out arrogance and approach stakeholders with humility and a listening stance. These include government regulators, elected officials, investors, pilot and flight attendant unions, suppliers, maintenance workers, the airlines themselves, and, of course, passengers. [...] A turnaround can't get off the ground without high employee engagement. If the workers who design, build and test the planes don't stand behind the company, no one else will."

=== News media ===
On March 11, just after the FAA reaffirmed the MAX's safety, several western media outlets, including the Financial Times, The New York Times, Fox News, and CNBC, questioned China's motives for grounding the aircraft by suggesting the action was either "politically motivated" or that China was "potentially benefiting from the grounding". After the rest of the world followed suit with their own groundings, aviation commentators saw this as having bolstered the global reputation of China's CAAC at the expense of the FAA.

On December 21, 2019, in its 'leaders" section, The Economist wrote: "Over the past decade Boeing has skimped on research, development and capital spending, investing only 7% of its sales on average, compared with around 10% at Airbus. Once the 737 MAX was the future. It is time for a new pilot and a new course."

In January 2020, Quartz Journalist Natasha Frost observed that Boeing inherited its current management culture from its 1997 merger with McDonnell Douglas.

Dan Catchpole, a journalist covering Boeing and aerospace summarized in Fortune magazine: "Scrutiny from journalists, crash investigators, regulators, Congress, and the Department of Justice has exposed profound flaws in Boeing's corporate culture—shaking its workforce, forcing supplier layoffs, and shattering fliers' trust."

Clive Irving, Condé Nast Traveler aviation expert, said: "One thing is for sure: in the history of air crash investigations, since the beginning of the Jet Age 60 years ago, there has never been such a serious and sustained breakdown in the safeguards intended to keep flying safe. [...] By the time that the FAA certified that the MAX was safe to fly, early in 2017, it was clear that the agency's culture was as steadfastly in denial as Boeing—even though there were already people in the FAA who knew how dangerous the situation was."

In May 2020, The Seattle Times reporters Dominic Gates, Steve Miletich, Mike Baker and Lewis Kamb were awarded a Pulitzer Prize for their coverage of the crisis.

=== Governance experts ===
About Boeing's board, veteran corporate governance expert Nell Minow said: "This is the quintessential 1990s board. It's CEOs and luminaries, but nobody with the kind of expertise you really need. [...] The board took no action after the first crash. That's unforgivable."

According to MSCI, a performance analytics research firm, Boeing scored 5.4 on a scale of 1–10 on its quality of governance, ranking in the bottom third of S&P 500 companies.

In April 2019, for a Boeing ballot, shareholder advisory firm Glass Lewis recommended voting against Lawrence Kellner, former chairman and CEO of Continental Airlines, citing that "the audit committee should have taken a more proactive role in identifying the risks associated with the 737 Max 8 aircraft." Even with the best companies, performing really well with great profit margins and great growth, a weak board is going to struggle when that company runs into a crisis situation. And that's what we're looking at here." As head of the audit committee, Kellner was technically responsible for the safety risks, but the board was never briefed on the MCAS software before the Lion Air crash. Kellner and Calhoun said that they don't consider it "as part of their job to inspect every technical feature on an airplane".

=== Politicians ===
- On March 12, 2019, U.S. President Donald Trump tweeted a complaint about complex airplane systems, and Boeing CEO Dennis Muilenburg called the president to assure him of the 737 MAX's safety. The FAA stated hours later that it had "no basis to order grounding the aircraft" and no data from other countries to justify such action.
- U.S. Senators Elizabeth Warren, Mitt Romney, Dianne Feinstein, Ted Cruz, Roger Wicker and Richard Blumenthal called for the FAA to temporarily ground all 737 MAX 8 and MAX 9 jets. Cruz and Wicker announced plans to hold a hearing in the Senate Commerce Subcommittee on Aviation and Space "to investigate these crashes, determine their contributing factors, and ensure that the United States aviation industry remains the safest in the world." Warren went as far as to question if the Trump administration was protecting Boeing.
- Kyrsten Sinema among other U.S. Senators at a March 28, 2019, hearing questioned a panel of regulators in the committee responsible for aviation oversight in the US Senate, "Is there more we need to do?" Kyrsten also questioned why more detail was not included in the flight operations manuals given to pilots not offering details of new features and systems like MCAS since the previous models: "Can you talk about why this was not included in pilot training material?"
- On April 15, 2019, President Trump tweeted: "What do I know about branding, maybe nothing (but I did become President!), but if I were Boeing, I would FIX the Boeing 737 MAX, add some additional great features, & REBRAND the plane with a new name."
- In May 2019, Congressman Sam Graves stated that errors made by the Indonesian and Ethiopian pilots for the 737 MAX crashes in Indonesia and Ethiopia. Graves continued that pilots trained in the USA would not have crashed. Noteworthy is that Boeing had not yet even acknowledged MCAS in the training literature at that point.
- On October 29, before the Senate Committee on Commerce, Science and Transportation, senator Richard Blumenthal said: "Boeing came to my office and said this was the result of pilot error, those pilots never had a chance, victims never had a chance, they were in flying coffins".
- On December 15, President Trump called Muilenburg, to inquire about the potential shutdown of 737 MAX production. Muilenburg assured Trump that the shutdown, set to begin in January 2020, was temporary and it would not cause any staff layoffs.
- President Trump made two executive orders to cut regulatory oversight and shift supervision to industry. His administration's 2019 budget cut 18% of the transportation department budget.
