= Jeff Smisek =

American businessman and investor (born 1954)

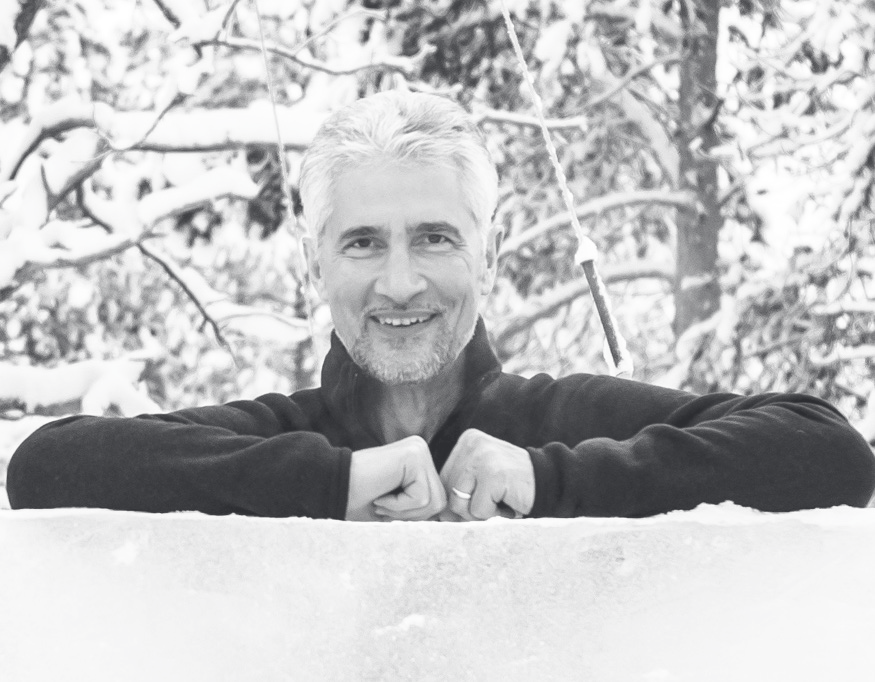
- Born: Jeffery Alan Smisek; August 17, 1954 (age 72)
- Education: Princeton University (A.B.); Harvard Law School (J.D.)
- Occupations: Chief Executive Officer, United Airlines, (2010–2015); Chief Executive Officer, Continental Airlines, (2010); President, Continental Airlines, (2004–2010); Chief Operating Officer, Continental Airlines, (2008–2010)
- Predecessor: Larry Kellner (Continental Airlines); Glenn Tilton (United Airlines)
- Successor: Oscar Munoz
- Spouse: Diana Strassmann

Jeffery Alan Smisek (born August 17, 1954) is an American businessman, who is the president of GOOSE Capital and on the board of directors of Finch Therapeutics. Smisek previously worked in the airline industry as the chairman, president, and chief executive officer (CEO) of Continental Airlines and, later, of United Airlines as a result of the United/Continental merger.

== Early life and education ==
Smisek was born in 1954. His father, Raymond, was a World War II bomber pilot. His mother, Betty, was a big-band singer with the USO. Smisek grew up on military bases around the United States and Europe until his parents permanently moved to San Antonio in 1963. Smisek graduated summa cum laude with an A.B. in economics from Princeton University in 1976 after completing a 74-page long senior thesis titled "Zoning and Non-Zoning in the Urban Property Market: An Empirical Study of Princeton, New Jersey." He received a J.D. magna cum laude from Harvard Law School in 1982.

== Career ==
Smisek started his career as a banker for Morgan Guaranty Trust Company of New York, now JP Morgan. Prior to his twenty years in the airline business, Smisek was a partner at Vinson & Elkins LLP. Smisek spent the bulk of his career in leadership positions at Continental Airlines (1995–2010) and United Airlines (2010–2015).

=== Continental Airlines (1995–2010) ===
In 1995 Continental's then-CEO Gordon Bethune persuaded Smisek to leave Vinson & Elkins to join Continental as General Counsel and help reverse the ailing airline's fortunes. Smisek became one of the chief architects of Continental's dramatic turnaround. Bethune once told USA Today that Smisek was the airline's savior. “It's not like in the movies when some guy saves an airplane from spinning to Earth...But he engineered the salvation of our company.” In 2004, Smisek became president and was elected to Continental's board of directors. He became chief operating officer in September 2008 and CEO in January 2010.

=== United Airlines (2010–2015) ===
As a wave of consolidation hit the airline industry in 2008, Smisek led negotiations to merge Continental with United Airlines. The two airlines announced a merger of the two carriers on May 2, 2010, which completed on October 1, 2010, keeping the United name and the Continental “globe” symbol, and Smisek became president, CEO and, eventually, chairman of the board. Smisek oversaw the complex merger, which sought to combine route networks, negotiate new contracts with its employee groups, and merge and update disparate IT systems. From 2010 to 2015, Smisek tripled the value of United's stock. Difficulties stemming from the merger of United and Continental led to initial complaints over customer service, employee satisfaction, and problems with the integration of Continental. However, by late 2014 Smisek had regained the trust of Wall Street analysts after a strategy of cost cuts, share buybacks and conservative expansion of capacities. Smisek resigned from United on September 8, 2015, following accusations that the airline had attempted to influence officials at the Port Authority of New York and New Jersey. Smisek was never charged with wrongdoing and instead Port Authority Chairman David Samson was convicted of a felony for impeding an airport project to coerce United Airlines to fly to Columbia Metropolitan Airport in South Carolina, near a home that he owned. Smisek left United Airlines with a severance payment worth $28.8 million.

=== Finch Therapeutics ===
In February 2017, Smisek led the $5.6 million Series A financing of Finch Therapeutics, a clinical-stage microbiome therapeutics company.

=== GOOSE Capital ===
In January 2021, GOOSE Capital—an investment firm composed of former Fortune 500 executives, industry leaders, and serial entrepreneurs—selected Smisek to serve as its president.

== Awards and honors ==
Smisek was named Aviation Week's Person of the Year for 2010.

== Personal life ==
Smisek is married to Diana Strassmann, an American economist, and has two children.

Business positions
Preceded by Glenn Tilton	CEO of United Airlines; 2010 – 2015	Succeeded by Oscar Munoz
Preceded by Larry Kellner	CEO of Continental Airlines; 2010 – 2012	Position abolished; merged with United Airlines
