= John W. Creighton Jr. =

American executive (1932–2020)

John Watson Creighton Jr.
- Creighton in 1954
- Born: September 1, 1932; Pittsburgh, Pennsylvania, U.S.
- Died: January 29, 2020 (aged 87); Bellevue, Washington, U.S.
- Education: Ohio State University (BSc '54, JD '57); University of Miami (MBA '65)
- Spouse: Janet M. Creighton (m. 1960)
- Children: 3
- Military career
- Branch: United States Army
- Service years: 1956–1957
- Rank: Sergeant
- Unit: 4th Infantry Division

John Watson Creighton Jr. (September 1, 1932 – January 29, 2020) was an American executive who served for nine years, from 1988 to 1997, as president and chief executive officer of Weyerhaeuser, a $7 billion, publicly traded timber company. In addition to Weyerhaeuser, he also served in senior management and executive positions with United Airlines, the University of Puget Sound, the U.S. Department of the Army, and the Boy Scouts of America.

== Early life and education ==
Creighton was born September 1, 1932, in Pittsburgh, Pennsylvania. He earned a B.S. from Ohio State University in 1954, a LLB from Ohio State in 1957, and an MBA from the School of Business at the University of Miami. Creighton was also a certified public accountant.

== Career ==
Creighton served as president and chief executive officer of Weyerhaeuser Company from 1988 through 1997. He was the first chair of Weyerhaeuser who was not a member of the Weyerhaeuser family. After retiring from Weyerhaeuser in 1997, he joined a Seattle investment firm, Madrona Venture Group where he advised local companies until his death. He also served as chairman and chief executive officer of UAL Corporation, the parent company of United Airlines.

=== Civic work ===
Creighton earned the Eagle Scout rank from the Boy Scouts of America (BSA) in 1946. As an adult, he was recognized for outstanding career and civic work by the BSA and awarded their Distinguished Eagle Scout Award. From 1997 to 1998, he served as the national president of the BSA. As national president, Creighton emphasized Scouting's traditional values and supported the growth of the BSA. Creighton said, "Scouting has always reflected the expectations of the American family. That so many American parents have chosen to involve their children in Scouting is a powerful testament to Scouting's effectiveness in building character in American youth." Creighton received several honors during his career, including the Prime Minister of Japan’s Letter of Commendation for International Trade and the Distinguished Volunteer Service Award from the Washington State University Foundation.

== Personal life ==
Creighton served in the U.S. Army. Prior to his death in 2020, at the age of 87, he served on the board of directors of Saltchuk, a transportation and distribution company. He and his wife had three children. His son and namesake, John W. Creighton III, served as a commissioner of the Port of Seattle.

== Footnotes ==
Business positions
Preceded by James E. Goodwin	CEO of UAL Corporation; October 2001 – September 2002	Succeeded by Glenn F. Tilton
Boy Scouts of America
Preceded by Norman Ralph Augustine	National president 1996 – 1998	Succeeded by Edward E. Whitacre Jr.
