= Tony Jannus Award =

American commercial aviation award since 1964

- Tony Jannus Award medallion
- Awarded for: Outstanding achievement in scheduled commercial aviation
- Country: United States
- Presented by: Tony Jannus Distinguished Aviation Society
- First award: 1964
- Website: http://www.tonyjannus.org

The Tony Jannus Award recognizes outstanding individual achievement in scheduled commercial aviation by airline executives, inventors and manufacturers, and government leaders. The award is conferred annually by the Tony Jannus Distinguished Aviation Society and was first bestowed in 1964 in Tampa, Florida, U.S. Its namesake, aviation pioneer Tony Jannus (1889–October 12, 1916), piloted the inaugural flight of the St. Petersburg–Tampa Airboat Line on January 1, 1914, the first scheduled commercial airline flight in the world using heavier-than-air aircraft. In addition to preserving the legacy of Tony Jannus, the non-profit society also offers financial assistance to college students pursuing studies in aviation and conducts an annual essay contest for high school students to encourage careers in aviation.

Past recipients of the award include such famed luminaries as Eddie Rickenbacker, Donald Douglas, Jimmy Doolittle, C. R. Smith (the founder of American Airlines), William A. Patterson (president of United Airlines 1934–1966), and Chuck Yeager. Those so honored are enshrined at the St. Petersburg Museum of History's First Airline Pavilion. The Museum, located 100 yards (91 m) from the site of the inaugural flight's takeoff on January 1, 1914, also has an operational replica of the Benoist XIV airplane flown by Jannus that day. On January 29, 2011, the American Institute of Aeronautics and Astronautics dedicated an historic site plaque on the museum's grounds, commemorating the site of the world’s first regularly scheduled airline.

== History ==
Tony Jannus was an early American pilot whose aerial exploits were widely publicized in aviation's pre-World War I period. He flew the first airplane from which a parachute jump was made, in 1912. Jannus was also the first airline pilot, having pioneered the inaugural flight of the St. Petersburg–Tampa Airboat Line on January 1, 1914, the first scheduled commercial airline flight in the world using heavier-than-air aircraft. Departing from a location near the downtown St. Petersburg Municipal Pier on Second Avenue North, Jannus piloted the twenty-three-minute inaugural flight of the pioneer airline's Benoist XIV flying boat biplane. A crowd of 3,000 gathered at the pier to watch the history-making takeoff at 10 a.m. and were told by organizer Percival Fansler that "What was impossible yesterday is an accomplishment today, while tomorrow heralds the unbelieveable" [sic].

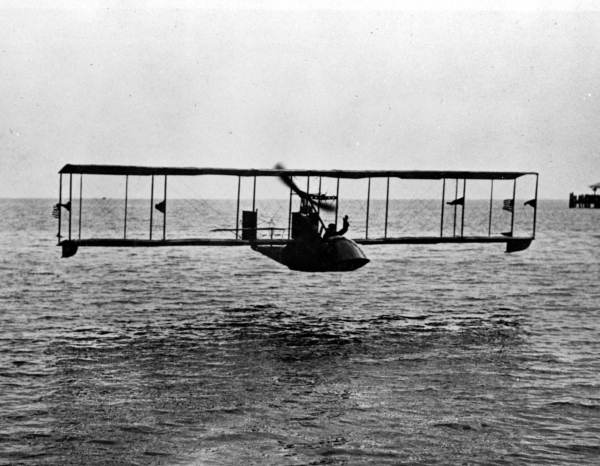
The St. Petersburg–Tampa Airboat Line over Tampa Bay, 1914

Occurring just ten years after Wilbur and Orville Wright's historic first airplane flight, the new St. Petersburg–Tampa Airboat Line began providing two daily round trips across Tampa Bay, departing St. Petersburg at 10 a.m. and 2 p.m., with return flights from Tampa departing at 11 a.m. and 3 p.m. At a fare of five dollars, it was the first time tickets were sold to the general public for point-to-point commercial air travel on a scheduled basis.

Fifty years later, in 1963, James Hamlett and the Greater Tampa Chamber of Commerce created the Tony Jannus Award to recognize the "Man who has done the most to advance the airline industry" and to celebrate the Tampa Bay area's historic role in the development of commercial aviation. The following March 1964, Senator A. S. Mike Monroney was named the first Tony Jannus Award recipient for his work as chairman of the U.S. Senate's Aviation Subcommittee and as chief proponent of the Federal Aviation Act of 1958 that created the Federal Aviation Administration. In the 1970s, the St. Petersburg Chamber of Commerce joined with the Tampa chamber to co-sponsor the award. The joint effort by the two chambers of commerce eventually evolved into the Tony Jannus Distinguished Aviation Society, a non-profit organization which now confers the award.

== Recipients of the Tony Jannus Award ==
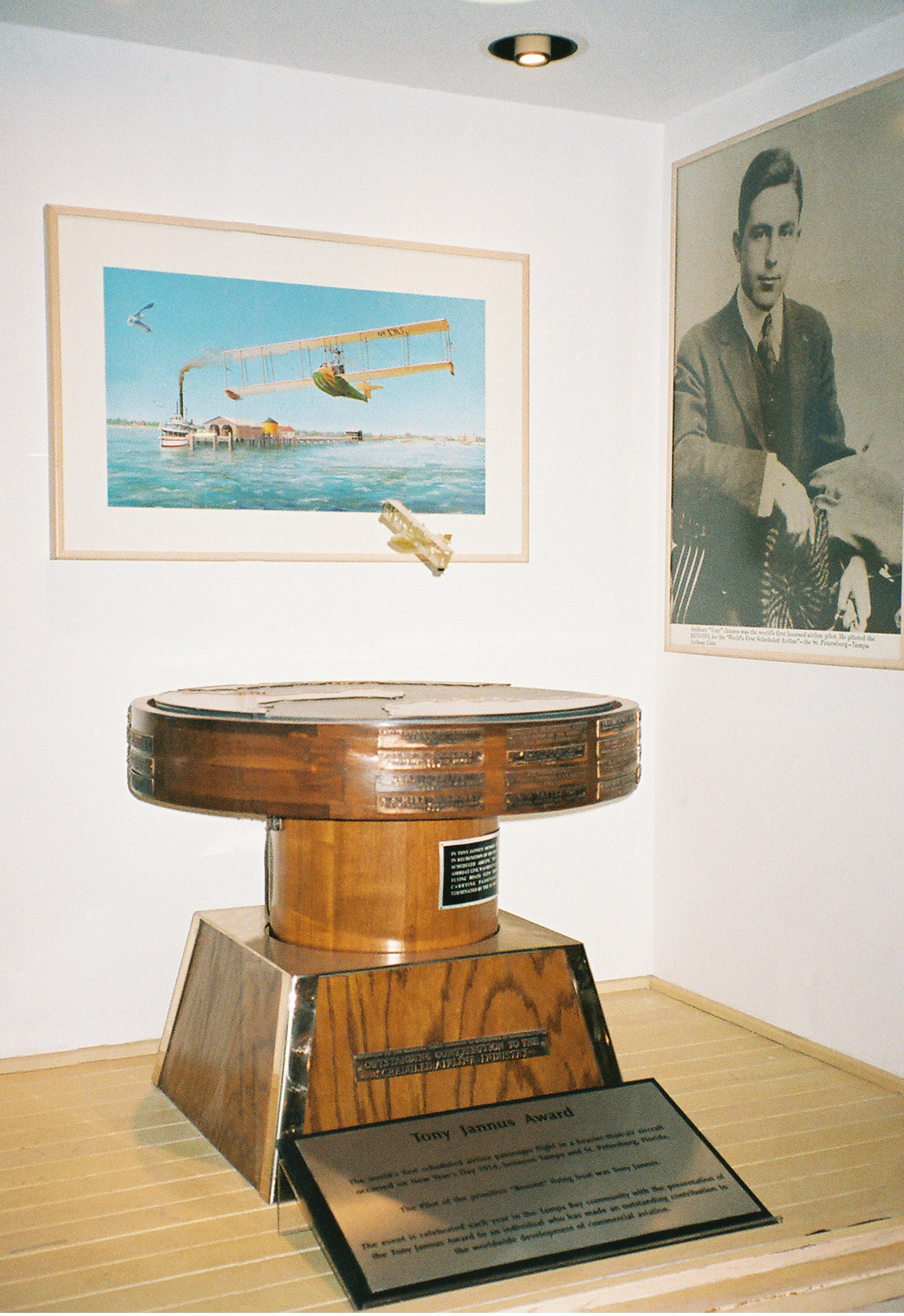
Permanent exhibit at Tampa International Airport honoring recipients of the Tony Jannus Award

Winners of the Tony Jannus Award are enshrined at the St. Petersburg Museum of History's First Airline Pavilion and Tony Jannus-related exhibits. The Museum, located 100 yards (91 m) from the site of the inaugural flight's takeoff on January 1, 1914, also has an operational replica of the Benoist XIV airplane flown by Jannus that day. The replica was built by the Florida Aviation Historical Society in 1983 and flown across Tampa Bay from St. Petersburg to Tampa on January 1, 1984, in a reenactment of the Jannus inaugural flight 70 years earlier. The replica was moved to the museum in January, 1993.

A permanent exhibit at Tampa International Airport also pays tribute to the following individuals (by year) who have received the Tony Jannus Award since 1964:

- 1964: A. S. Mike Monroney — U.S. Senator, Oklahoma
- 1965: Juan Trippe — founder, Pan American Airways
- 1966: Donald Wills Douglas, Sr. — founder, Douglas Aircraft Company
- 1967: Eddie Rickenbacker — chairman, Eastern Air Lines and Medal of Honor recipient and World War I aviator
- 1968: William A. Patterson — president of United Airlines (1934–1966)
- 1969: Frank Whittle — jet engine developer
- 1970: Daniel J. Haughton – chairman, Lockheed Aircraft
- 1971: William M. Allen — chairman, Boeing
- 1972: Jimmy Doolittle — instrument flight developer and Medal of Honor World War II aviator
- 1973: Geoffrey Knight and Henri Ziegler — Concorde co-developers
- 1974: Bill Lear — aircraft radios and avionics developer
- 1975: Elrey Borge Jeppesen — founder and chairman, Jeppesen
- 1976: C. R. Smith – founder, American Airlines
- 1977: Robert F. Six — founder, Continental Airlines
- 1978: Donald Nyrop – chairman, Northwest Airlines
- 1979: Jehangir Tata — founder, Air India
- 1980: Thomas Davis – founder, Piedmont Airlines
- 1981: Howard W. Cannon — U.S. Senator, Nevada
- 1982: Manuel Sosa de la Vega – president, Mexicana de Aviación
- 1983: David C. Garrett, Jr. — president, Delta Air Lines
- 1984: Knut Hammarskjold – director general, International Air Transport Association
  Wayne Parrish – aviation publisher
- 1985: Edward Curtis Wells — aircraft designer, Boeing
- 1986: Frank Borman — chairman, Eastern Air Lines and astronaut
- 1987: Jerome F. Lederer — founder, Flight Safety Foundation
- 1989: Sir Lenox Hewitt – chairman, Qantas
- 1990: Edwin Colodny – chairman, US Airways
- 1991: Colin Marshall — CEO, British Airways
- 1992: Thornton A. Wilson — chairman, Boeing
- 1993: Herbert D. Kelleher — CEO, Southwest Airlines
- 1994: Alan S. Boyd — U.S. Secretary of Transportation
- 1995: Martin Schröder – founder, Martinair
- 1996: J. George Mikelsons — founder, ATA Airlines
- 1997: Chuck Yeager — supersonic flight pioneer
- 1998: Angus Kinnear – president, Canada 3000
- 1999: Federico Bloch – CEO, Grupo TACA
- 2000: Richard Branson — chairman, Virgin Atlantic
- 2001: Robert Crandall — CEO, American Airlines
- 2002: Freddie Laker — founder, Laker Airways
- 2003: Gordon Bethune — CEO, Continental Airlines
- 2004: Norman Mineta — U.S. Secretary of Transportation
- 2005: David Neeleman — CEO, JetBlue Airways
- 2006: Joe Leonard – CEO, AirTran Airways
- 2007: Colleen Barrett — president, Southwest Airlines
- 2008: Larry Kellner — CEO, Continental Airlines
- 2009: James L. Oberstar — U.S. Congressman
- 2010: Jaan Albrecht – CEO, Star Alliance since 2001
- 2011: Frederick W. Smith — Founder and CEO, FedEx
- 2012: Frederico Curado – CEO, Embraer
- 2013: Richard H. Anderson — CEO, Delta Air Lines
- 2014: Pedro Heilbron— CEO, Copa Airlines
- 2015: Maurice J. Gallagher, Jr., CEO, Allegiant Air
- 2016: Gary C. Kelly, CEO, Southwest Airlines
- 2017: Doug Parker, CEO, American Airlines
- 2018: Chesley Sullenberger, airline safety advocate and "Miracle on the Hudson" US Airways pilot
- 2019: Tom Enders, CEO, Airbus
- 2022: Brad Tilden, CEO, Alaska Airlines
- 2023: Joanna Geraghty, CEO, JetBlue
- 2024: Peter Ingram, CEO Hawaiian Airlines
- 2025: Ed Bastian, CEO, Delta Air Lines

== Tony Jannus Distinguished Aviation Society ==
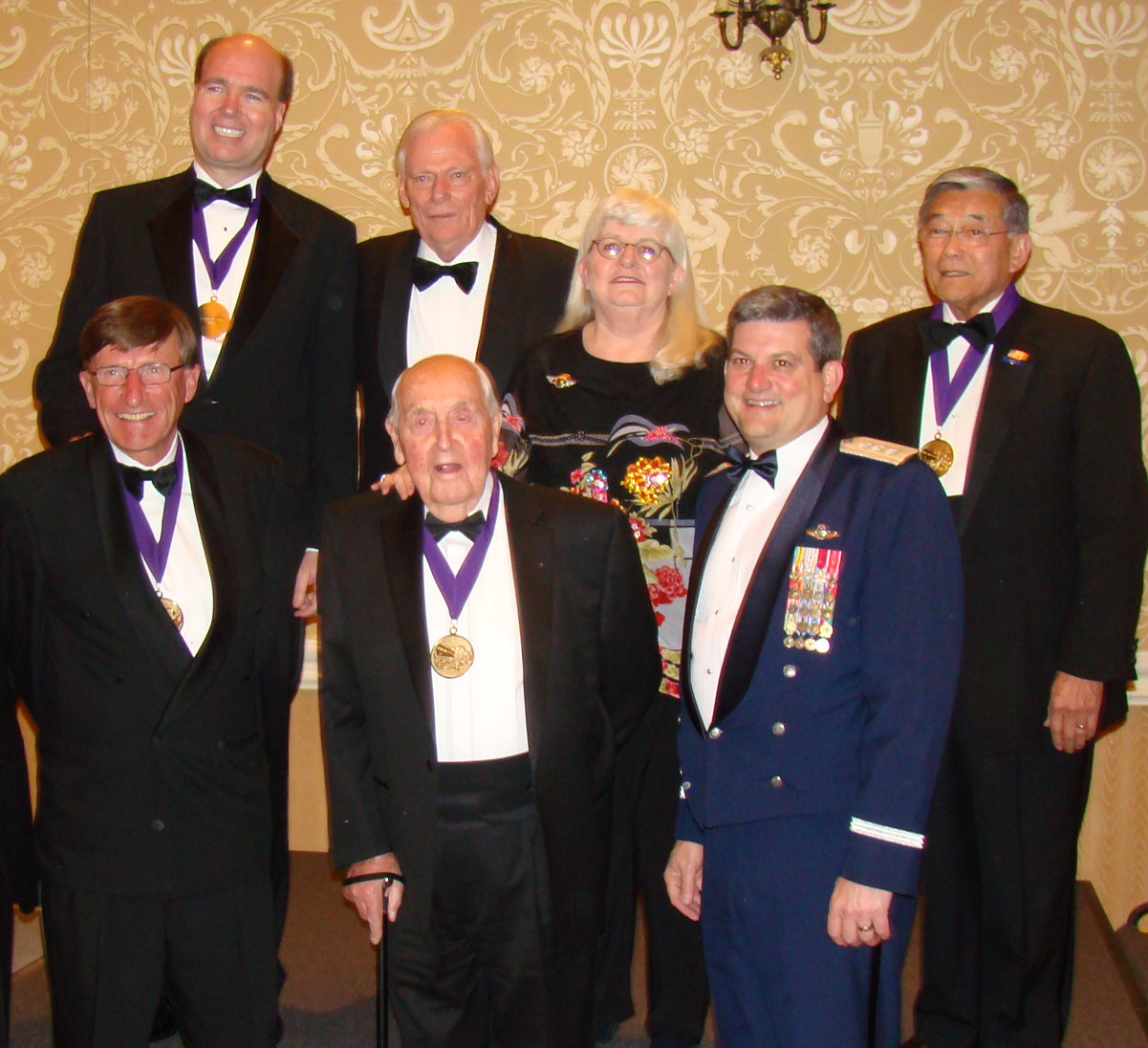
Tony Jannus Award recipients at the annual awards banquet in 2008: (l–r, front row:) Angus Kinnear—Canada 3000 Sir Lenox Hewitt—Qantas (rear:) Larry Kellner—Continental Airlines, Herb Kelleher—Southwest Airlines, Colleen Barrett, and Norman Mineta. Also pictured, award presenter, Lt Gen Rusty Findley II, USAF—Vice Commander, Air Mobility Command

The Society is a 501(c)(3) non-profit organization based in Tampa, Florida, and governed by a board of directors composed of distinguished industry leaders and Tampa Bay area officials. Financial support is provided by prominent companies and organizations related to the aviation industry. The stated threefold mission of the Society is to:

- Promote the recognition and understanding that the first scheduled commercial passenger airline operated between St. Petersburg and Tampa, Florida.
- Provide scholarships and financial aid for college level education in the field of commercial aviation or related fields.
- Encourage the interest and participation of high school students in commercial aviation.

The Society holds its annual luncheon and dinner banquet in the Tampa Bay area, when the Tony Jannus Award is conferred for that year, in the presence of past recipients. These meetings are also the occasion for recognizing those college students selected to receive the Society's financial assistance, along with high school students excelling in the Essay Contest.

== See also ==
- List of aviation awards
