= Larry Kellner =

American businessman

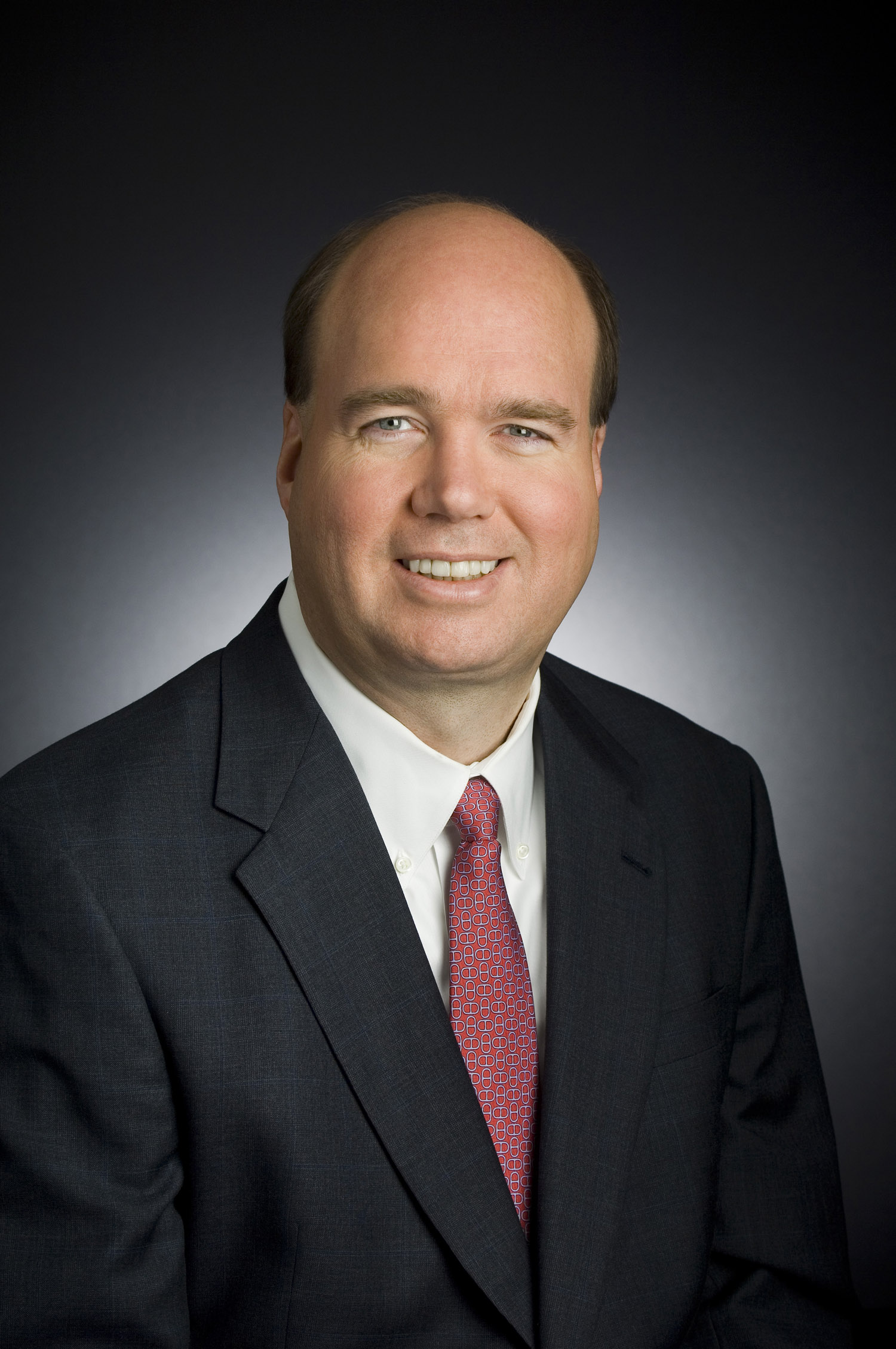
- Born: January 19, 1959 (age 67); Worthington, Minnesota, U.S.
- Education: University of South Carolina

Lawrence W. Kellner (born January 19, 1959) is a former CEO of Continental Airlines, having succeeded Gordon Bethune as CEO in December 2004. Prior to his arrival at Continental, he was the chief financial officer of American Savings Bank. Kellner retired as the airline's CEO at the end of December 2009. During his career at Continental, he previously was a vice president, chief financial officer and chief operating officer. He was chairman of The Boeing Company from 2019 to 2024. Kellner is president of Emerald Creek Group, LLC - a Texas-based private equity firm primarily focused on real estate and is on the board of directors at ExxonMobil.

== Early life ==
Kellner was born in Worthington, Minnesota, and grew up in Sumter, South Carolina. He graduated from the University of South Carolina in 1981 with a degree in accounting. He resides in Austin, Texas.

Kellner is the 2008 recipient of the Tony Jannus Award for distinguished achievement in commercial air transportation. In July 2009, Continental announced Kellner's retirement as its CEO at the end of the year.

== Career ==
Kellner is the prior vice chairman of the Greater Houston Partnership, and that organization's current chairman. Kellner was elected to Boeing's board of directors in 2011 and served through until 2024, including as chair from 2019 to 2024. He was a trustee of Rice University

Kellner was a member of the National Executive Board of the Boy Scouts of America, the organization's governing body.

== Awards and honors ==
Kellner was named Tony Jannus Award's Person of the Year for 2008.

Business positions
Preceded by Dave Calhoun	Chairman of The Boeing Company; 2019 – 2024	Succeeded by Steve Mollenkopf
Preceded by Gordon Bethune	Chairman and CEO of Continental Airlines; 2004 – 2010	Succeeded by Jeff Smisek
Preceded by Greg Brenneman	COO of Continental Airlines; 2003 – 2004	Succeeded by Jeff Smisek
Preceded by Greg Brenneman	President of Continental Airlines; 2001 – 2003	Succeeded by Jeff Smisek
