= Glenn Tilton =

American oil and airline industry executive (born 1948)

Glenn F. Tilton
- Born: April 1948 (age 78); Washington, D.C., U.S.
- Education: University of South Carolina (BA)
- Occupations: Oil and airline executive
- Years active: 1970–2014
- Known for: CEO of Texaco and United Airlines
- Board member of: Abbott Laboratories; JPMorgan Chase (Midwest Chairman)
- Children: 2
- Awards: Order of Lincoln (2014)

Glenn Fletcher Tilton (born April 1948, in Washington, D.C.) is a retired American oil and airline industry executive. Tilton spent most of his career working for Texaco, and as CEO guided its merger with Chevron Oil in 2001. He was chairman, president, and CEO of UAL Corporation from 2002 to 2010. He stayed on as non-executive chairman of United Continental Holdings Inc., (NYSE:UAL), the parent company of the merged United Airlines, Inc. and Continental Airlines, Inc. from October 1, 2010, until 2012. Tilton was Midwest chairman and a member of the executive committee at JP Morgan Chase (NYSE:JPM), from June 6, 2011, until his retirement in June, 2014.

Tilton testifies before the United States Senate Committee on Commerce, Science and Transportation in June 2010

Tilton is a former chairman of the Air Transport Association, the industry trade organization representing U.S. airlines.

== Early life ==
Tilton grew up in Latin America, and attended high school in Brazil, where his father worked for the United States' Central Intelligence Agency. After earning a bachelor's degree in International Relations from the University of South Carolina, Tilton wanted to start a career in the airline industry, but was warned against it by a family friend, the manager of the Pan American Airways Latin America Division. Tilton listened to the friend's advice and went on to follow his father's footsteps and join the C.I.A. but months before his start date, Tilton began a career in the private sector working for Texaco in 1970, servicing gas stations throughout Washington, D.C.

== Career ==
Tilton attained positions of increasing responsibility over the next three decades, and in early 2001 Tilton was briefly named chairman and chief executive officer before Chevron and Texaco merged to form ChevronTexaco Corporation. He was named vice chairman of the newly merged company in late 2001 and a few months later he was also named interim chairman of Dynegy, in which ChevronTexaco held a significant stake.

In September 2002, Tilton was recruited by the board of directors of the struggling UAL Corporation to be chairman, president, and CEO, replacing John W. Creighton Jr. as chairman and CEO, and Rono Dutta as president. The board believed that an airline outsider with bankruptcy experience such as Tilton could turnaround the struggling carrier. UAL Corporation and its subsidiaries filed for bankruptcy in December 2002, three months into Tilton's tenure.

What would follow would be one of the largest, longest, and most complex bankruptcy cases in American history. UAL Corporation operated in bankruptcy until February 2, 2006. Amid the succession of external crises spanning from the September 11 attacks to the Great Recession, UAL incurred $11.7 billion under Tilton's leadership.

Tilton is controversial for his stance as a major advocate for consolidation in the airline industry to reduce cost and capacity. Tilton has stated he believes it is the only way to end commercial aviation's cycles of booms and busts. Since 2006, Tilton had been searching for a merger partner for United Airlines. In May 2010, Tilton signed a deal to merge UAL Corporation with Continental Airlines, Inc. to form United Continental Holdings, Inc. of which Tilton was the first chairman of the board. As agreed prior to the merger of United and Continental, Tilton was replaced by CEO Jeff Smisek as chairman on December 31, 2012.

Tilton serves on the board of directors of Abbott Laboratories and a member of the U.S. Travel & Tourism Advisory Board. Tilton also serves on the board of trustees for the Field Museum and the Museum of Science and Industry, and the board for the Economic Club of Chicago, the Executives' Club of Chicago, and After School Matters, as well as on the civic committee of the Commercial Club of Chicago and the International Relations Advisory Council of Chicago 2016.

== Family ==
Tilton and his wife, Jackie, have two children.

== Awards ==
Glenn F. Tilton was inducted as a laureate of The Lincoln Academy of Illinois and awarded the Order of Lincoln (the state's highest honor) by the Governor of Illinois in 2014 in the area of business and industry.

Business positions
Preceded by John W. Creighton Jr.	CEO of UAL Corporation; September 2002 – October 2010	Succeeded by Jeffrey A. Smisek
