= Diana Strassmann =

American economist

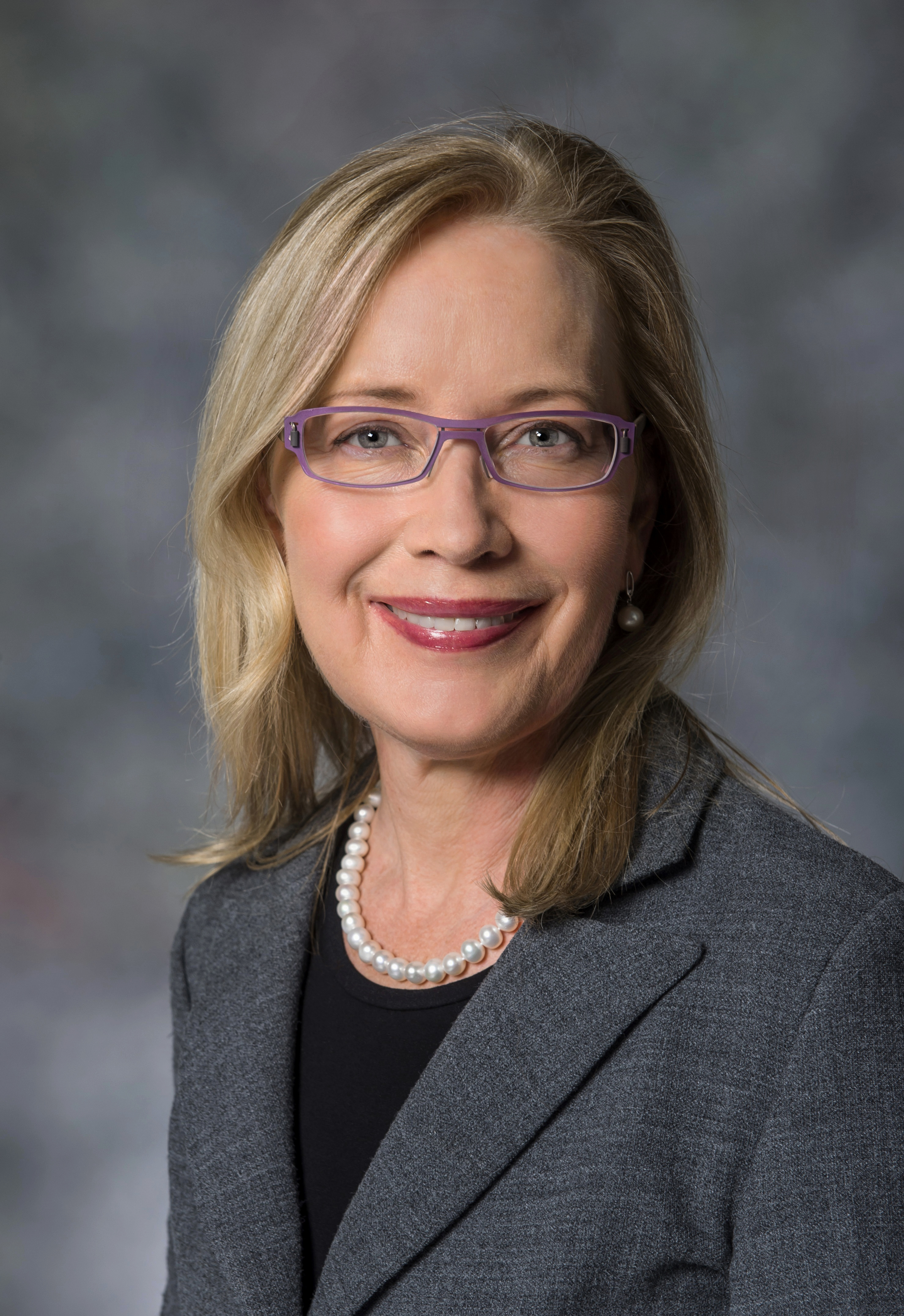
- Strassmann in 2015
- Spouse: Jeff Smisek

Academic background
- Education: Princeton University (AB); Harvard University (MA, PhD)

Academic work
- Discipline: Feminist economics
- Institutions: Rice University and Wiki Education Foundation (Chair)
- Website: humanities.rice.edu/academics/school-level-faculty/diana-strassmann

Notes
- PhD thesis An empirical investigation of dynamic limit pricing and contestable markets in the deregulated airline industry. (1983)

Diana Louise Strassmann is an American economist, and the Carolyn and Fred McManis Distinguished Professor of Humanities at Rice University, and also co-founder of International Association for Feminist Economics and its journal Feminist Economics.

== Education ==
After graduating from East Lansing High School in East Lansing, Michigan in 1973, Strassmann completed her AB in economics at Princeton University in 1977, her MA from Harvard University in Economics from in 1982 and her PhD from Harvard in 1983.

== Career ==
Strassman is director of the Rice University Program on Poverty, Justice, and Human Capabilities, co-founder of International Association for Feminist Economics (IAFFE) and founding editor of the IAFFE journal Feminist Economics.

== Publications ==
In 2011 she co-authored Feminist economics: feminism, economics, and well-being a "major three-volume research collection that demonstrates the breadth and significance of feminist scholarship in economics."
