= Gordon Bethune =

American naval aviator and businessman (1941-)

- Born: August 29, 1941 (age 85); San Antonio, Texas
- Education: Abilene Christian University, (B.S.); Harvard Business School, (Adv. Mgt.)
- Occupations: Chief Executive Officer, Continental Airlines (1994-2004); Vice President, Boeing, (1988-1994); Vice President, Braniff, (1978-1982); Sr. Vice President, Piedmont Airlines, (1984-1988)

Gordon M. Bethune (born August 29, 1941) is a retired US airline executive. He was the CEO of Continental Airlines from 1994 until his retirement at the end of 2004. He was on the boards of Honeywell and Prudential Financial. Bethune was known for ensuring that he received some time as a pilot when taking delivery of a new Continental Airlines Boeing 767 from Boeing and repositioning it from Seattle to Houston.

== Early life and US Navy service ==
Bethune was born in San Antonio, Texas to Pearl Elley and Jack Bethune, who was serving in the U.S. Army at that time. Bethune grew up in Austin, Texas and spent summers with his father, who owned an aerial crop dusting company in Hernando, Mississippi. Bethune joined the U.S. Navy in 1958 at age 17, becoming an aviation electronics technician. In January 1960, he was serving in Heavy Attack Squadron 11 aboard the USS Franklin D. Roosevelt. He rose to the rank of chief petty officer, chief warrant officer, and over time received his commission as a lieutenant. In 1978, he retired with twin bars of a full lieutenant. His last duty station was with Patrol Squadron Nineteen (Big Red) stationed at Moffett Field, CA. Bethune holds a commercial pilot certificate with type ratings in the Douglas DC-3, Boeing 757, and Boeing 767.

== Early career ==
In 1978, a Navy friend asked whether Bethune would consider joining Braniff International Airways as a maintenance manager. He agreed and later became the vice president of maintenance. Bethune later was vice president of engineering and maintenance for Western Airlines. He spent thirteen months with Western before leaving to become senior vice president of operations at Piedmont Airlines. Bethune was vice president and general manager of The Boeing Company's Customer Services Division and later the Renton Division where he was responsible for the production of the B737 and B757 airplanes.

Bethune earned a bachelor's degree from Abilene Christian University in 1984.

== Continental Airlines ==
Bethune was hired as COO and president of Continental Airlines in 1994 after the airline had twice faced bankruptcy. Bethune later became the airline's CEO in November 1994 and was elected chairman of the board of directors in 1996.

BusinessWeek magazine named Bethune one of the Top 25 Global Managers in 1996 and 1997. Under his leadership Continental's stock price rose from $2 to over $50 per share. Fortune magazine named Continental among the 100 Best Companies to Work for in America for six consecutive years. In his final year with the airline, Fortune ranked Continental as 2004's No. 1 Most Admired Global Airline, a title it earned again in 2005, 2006, 2007 and 2008. Bethune released his book, From Worst to First: Behind the Scenes of Continental's Remarkable Comeback, in 1999 detailing his time at that carrier.

Following his career with Continental, Bethune became the non-executive chairman for the former Aloha Airlines. He was on the board of directors of Prudential Financial, Honeywell, Sprint Corp, and Park Hotels and Resorts. He was a contributor to CNBC following his retirement.

== Awards and honors ==
In 1999, Bethune was the National Honorary Initiate of Delta Sigma Pi at the Grand Chapter Congress in Houston. In 2003, he received the Tony Jannus Award for outstanding leadership in the Commercial Aviation industry. In 2006, he was awarded the Lloyd P. Nolen Lifetime Achievement in Aviation Award by the Wings over Houston Airshow.

Additionally, he was recognized as one of the Top 25 Global Managers, BusinessWeek, 1996; Laureate in Aviation Trophy, National Air and Space Museum, 1997; 25 Most Influential Executives, Business Travel News, 1998, 2000; 50 Best CEOs in America, Worth, 2001, 2002, 2003; Airline Person of the Year, Travel Agent, 2001.

The Wings Club New York City awarded him the Distinguished Achievement award in 2004. The Navy League of New York presented him The Life Time Achievement Award in 2014. Bethune received the 2009 Philip J. Klass Award for Lifetime Achievement from Aviation Week & Space Technology. The award stated: "...Bethune has spent a lifetime relentlessly searching for ways to make things work better ... has few rivals ... in both his achievements and his popularity with employees."

Preceded by Robert Ferguson	CEO of Continental Airlines; 1994 – 2004	Succeeded by Larry Kellner
