= UAL Corporation =

Former name of the Delaware holding company of United Airlines

- Formerly: UAL, Inc. Allegis Corporation
- Company type: Public
- Traded as: Nasdaq: UAUA
- Industry: Transport
- Founded: December 30, 1968
- Founder: George Keck
- Defunct: October 1, 2010
- Fate: Merged with Continental Airlines
- Successor: United Airlines Holdings, Inc.
- Headquarters: Chicago, Illinois, U.S.
- Area served: Worldwide
- Key people: Glenn F. Tilton, Executive Chairman, President and CEO
- Revenue: ▼US$16,335 Million (2009)
- Net income: ▲US$-651 Million (2009)
- Number of employees: 47,000 (2009)
- Subsidiaries: United Airlines, Inc.

UAL Corporation is the former name of United Airlines Holdings, an airline holding company, incorporated in Delaware with headquarters in Chicago, Illinois. UAL held a 100 percent controlling interest in United Airlines, Inc., one of the world's largest air carriers, and is a founding member of the Star Alliance. It was announced on May 2, 2010, that UAL Corporation and Continental Airlines, Inc. would pursue a merger pending government approval. UAL Corporation would acquire Continental Airlines, Inc. and change its name to United Continental Holdings (UCH). On October 1, 2010, UCH, formerly UAL Corporation, announced completion of the merger. On Thursday June 27, 2019, United changed the name of its parent company from United Continental Holdings to United Airlines Holdings.

UAL Corp. passed to its successor its major operations at Chicago-O'Hare, Denver, Los Angeles, San Francisco, and Washington-Dulles. UAL's United Airlines, Inc. held several key air rights, including one of the two American carriers authorized to serve Asia from Tokyo-Narita. UAL's United was the largest U.S. carrier to China and maintained operations throughout Asia.

== History ==
UAL, Inc., was incorporated December 30, 1968 as a Delaware corporation as part of a reorganization of United Airlines, its largest subsidiary, having a storied history. UAL, Inc. was the creation of then United Airlines president George Keck, a Chicago native, who worked his way up through the ranks of United Airlines to become president and then chief executive officer, who formed the holding company to allow United to diversify.

Between 1970 and 1988 UAL, Inc. acquired the Westin and Hilton hotel chains and the Hertz car rental company, as well as a regional airline, a reservations network, and several leasing and insurance companies. On April 30, 1987, UAL, Inc. changed its name to Allegis Corporation. Wall Street analysts believed that Allegis' subsidiaries were worth more individually than valued by the parent company's stock price. Reacting to this opinion just weeks after the company changed its name, a group led by United Airlines employees moved to acquire ownership. However, the group was unable to secure the necessary financing and Allegis' management subsequently divested (sold) its non-airline subsidiaries. On May 26, 1988, Allegis changed its name to UAL Corporation, with United Airlines, Inc. as its sole major subsidiary.

United Airlines employees’ continued effort to buy the airline's parent company was realized in 1993. The Board of Directors of UAL in December 1993 agreed to an Employee Stock Ownership Plan (ESOP), with employees accepting salary and benefit reductions and work rule changes in exchange for stock. Employees gained an equity stake of 55%, thus making them the majority owners of UAL Corporation. UAL became the world's largest employee-owned company.

During the mid-1990s the scheme worked well for UAL. The company was able to stabilize its finances, which had been weakened by the recession earlier in the decade and the divestiture of Allegis' profitable assets. In the late 1990s UAL's United Airlines subsidiary grew to be the world's largest airline, as well as one of the most profitable.

Yet in 2000, UAL's fortunes began to dim. In April 2000, the ESOP investment period ended for most US employees, prompting United's unions to fight for higher wages. Labor issues, air traffic congestion and poor weather forced widespread flight cancellations during the summer of 2000, harming the airline's reputation. Then UAL Corporation announced its intent to merge with US Airways Group, Inc., the operator of US Airways. The deal collapsed in mid-2001, due to opposition from the U.S. government and employees. Then came the tragedy of September 11. The company ended 2001 with a record loss of $2.1 billion.

As losses continued into 2002, Glenn Tilton, a former Texaco CEO with experience operating a troubled company, was brought in by UAL's board of directors to prevent bankruptcy, or, if needed, guide the company through a bankruptcy. Tilton was appointed chairman, President, and CEO of UAL Corporation and United Airlines, Inc. in September 2002. Tilton sought wage cuts from employees and applied for a U.S. government loan guarantee to avoid filing for bankruptcy. By early December, the company had reached agreements with most of its unions for wage reductions, but its loan application was rejected Dec. 4. On Dec. 9, UAL and its subsidiaries filed for Chapter 11 reorganization. UAL quickly received debtor-in-possession (DIP) financing to allow it to continue "business as usual" while it reorganized its debt, capital and cost structures. The year ended with UAL seeking immediate voluntary wage reductions from all employee groups or permission from the bankruptcy court to impose those reductions in order to meet the strict covenants established by the DIP lenders.

What followed was one of the largest, longest, and most complex bankruptcy cases in US history. UAL Corporation and its subsidiaries emerged from bankruptcy protection on February 1, 2006.

On December 8, 2009, UAL Corporation announced an order for 25 Airbus A350 and 25 Boeing 787 aircraft, with purchase rights for 50 more of each.

The years following emergence from bankruptcy garnered mixed results for UAL. The company turned a profit in 2007, but the fuel crisis in the summer 2008, when crude oil briefly reached $147 a barrel, pushed the company into losses. After decades of boom and bust cycles, CEO Tilton pushed for a merger with another major US carrier. Tilton stated that a larger market-share and a more diverse route network was the way for UAL to reach sustained profitability, though many, including UAL's unions groups, strongly disagreed.

In early 2008, UAL Corporation held merger talks with American airline operator Continental Airlines The deal was called off after problems in the credit markets, as well as weak support from labor groups, prevented the merger. UAL's United then decided to form an alliance with Continental.

On May 2, 2010, United announced a full merger between the two carriers. The combined airline uses the trade name United Airlines with the Continental globe logo, which would be completed by October 1, 2010.

== Directors ==
The directors of UAL Corporation at the time of the merger were:

- Glenn F. Tilton, Chairman/President/CEO
- Wendy Morse (Pilots' Union)
- Stephen R. Canale (Machinist & Aerospace Workers union)
- David J. Vitale
- Robert D. Krebs
- Steve Miller
- James J. O'Connor (Lead Director)
- Mary K. Bush
- John H. Walker
- Richard J. Almeida
- Walter Isaacson
- Jane F. Garvey

== Subsidiaries ==
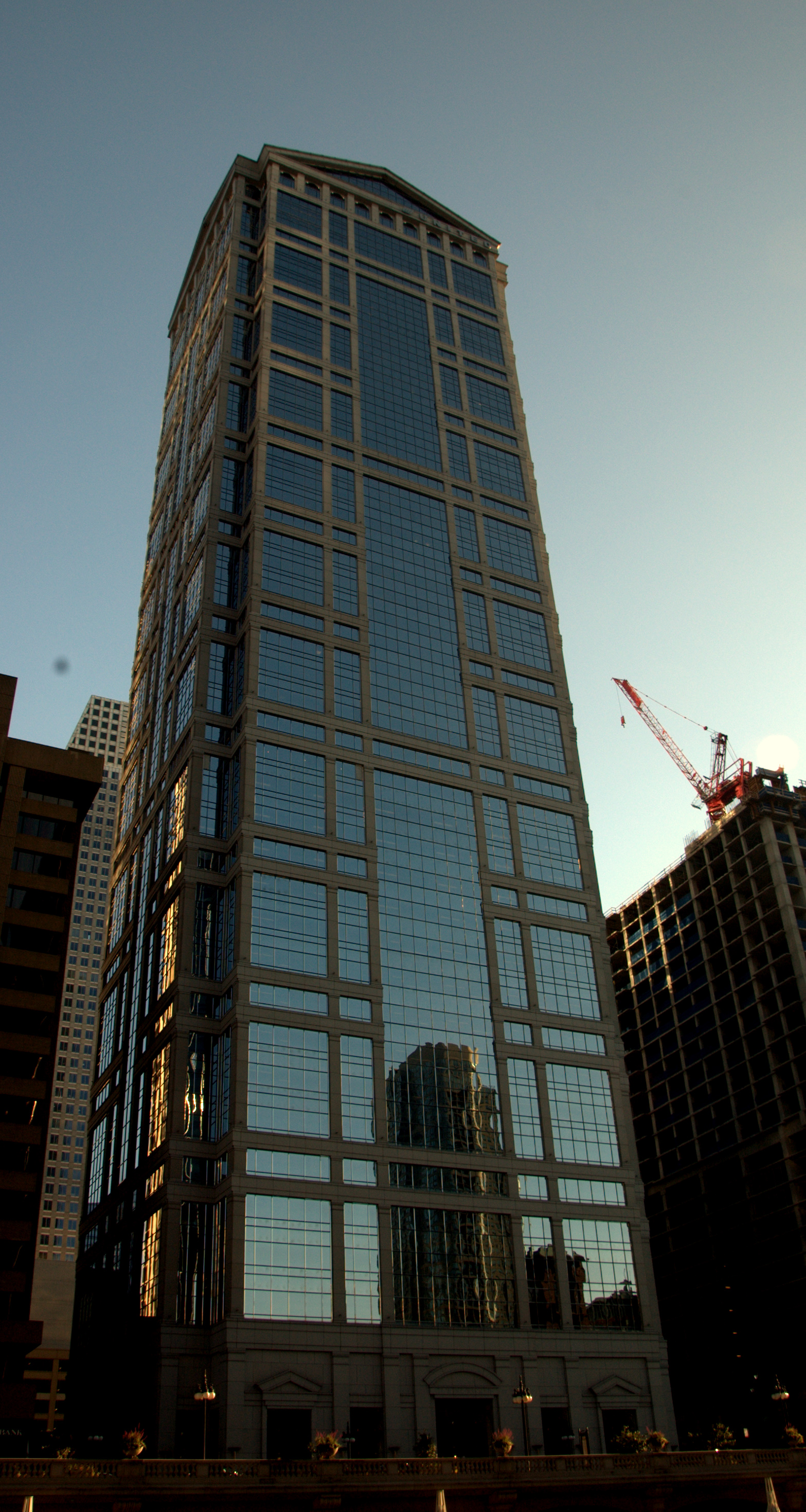
UAL Corporation World Headquarters, 77 West Wacker Drive in Downtown Chicago

The company's subsidiaries at the time of the merger were:

- United Airlines, Inc. (including United Cargo)
  - Covia, LLC
  - Domicile Management Services, Inc. (also subsidiary of Air Wis Services)
  - Kion de Mexico, S.A. de C.V
  - Kion Leasing, Inc.
  - Premier Meeting and Travel Services, Inc.
  - UAL Loyalty Services Inc. (loyalty programs and travel clubs, including United Cruises)
    - Mileage Plus Holdings Inc.
      - Mileage Plus Marketing, Inc. (administers the Mileage Plus frequent flyer program)
    - ULS Ventures, Inc.
  - United Airlines Ventures, Inc.
  - United Aviation Fuels Corporation (fuel purchasing unit)
  - United Cogen, Inc. (develops and operates cogeneration and power projects)
  - United GHS, Inc. (ground handling services)
  - United Vacations Inc.
  - United Worldwide Corporation
- Air Wis Services, Inc.
  - Air Wisconsin, Inc. (not to be confused with Air Wisconsin Airlines Corporation, an independent corporation and former United Express partner)
  - Domicile Management Services, Inc. (also subsidiary of United Airlines)
- Four Star Insurance Company, Ltd.
- Four Star Leasing, Inc.
- UAL Benefits Management, Inc.
- UAL Company Services Inc.
