= Dennis Muilenburg =

Former president, chairman and CEO of Boeing

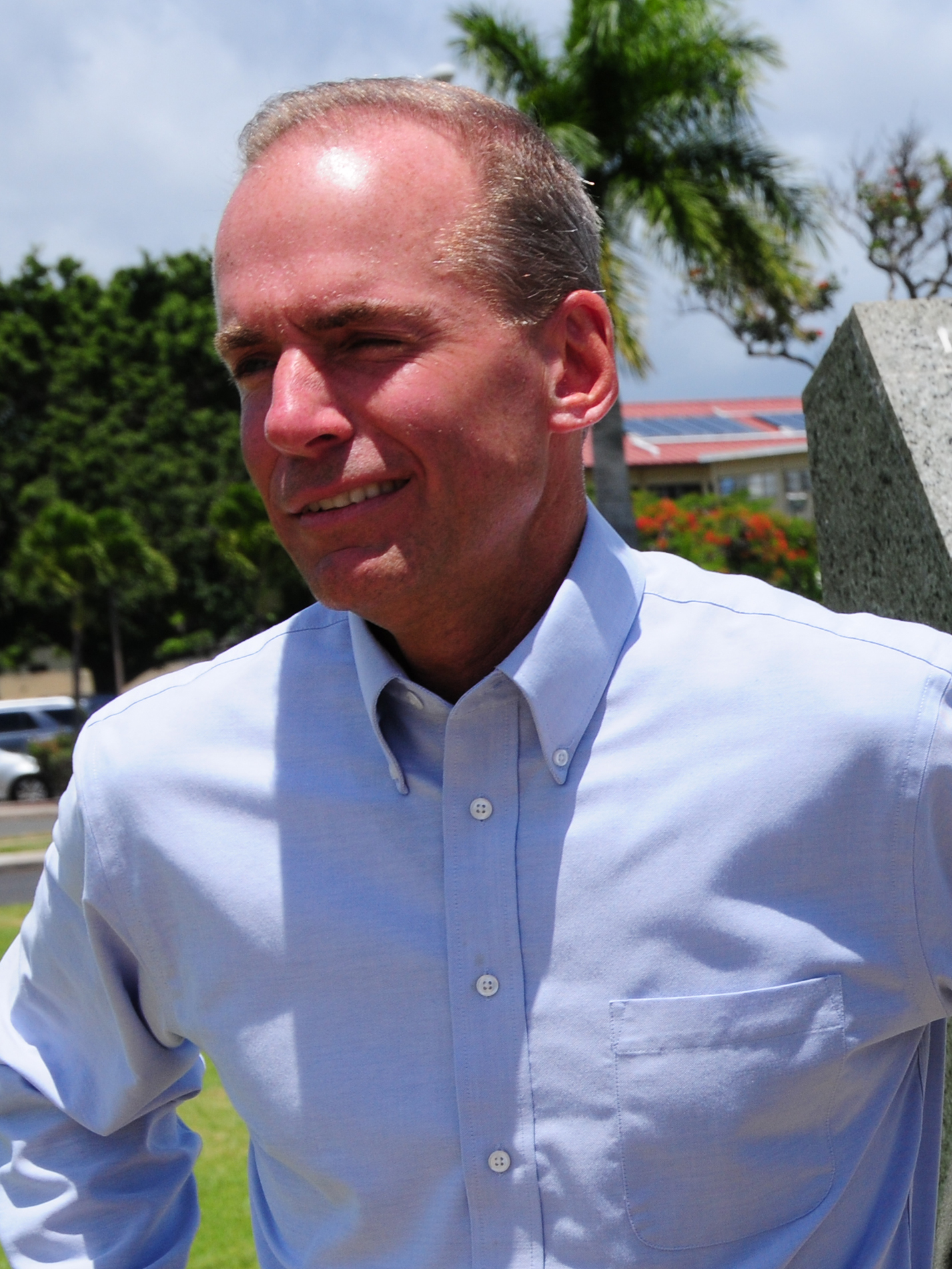
- Muilenburg in 2011
- Born: 1964 (age 61–62); Orange City, Iowa, U.S.
- Education: Iowa State University (BS); University of Washington (MS)
- Occupation: Business executive
- Title: Former CEO, Boeing
- Term: 2015–2019
- Predecessor: James McNerney
- Successor: Dave Calhoun

Signature
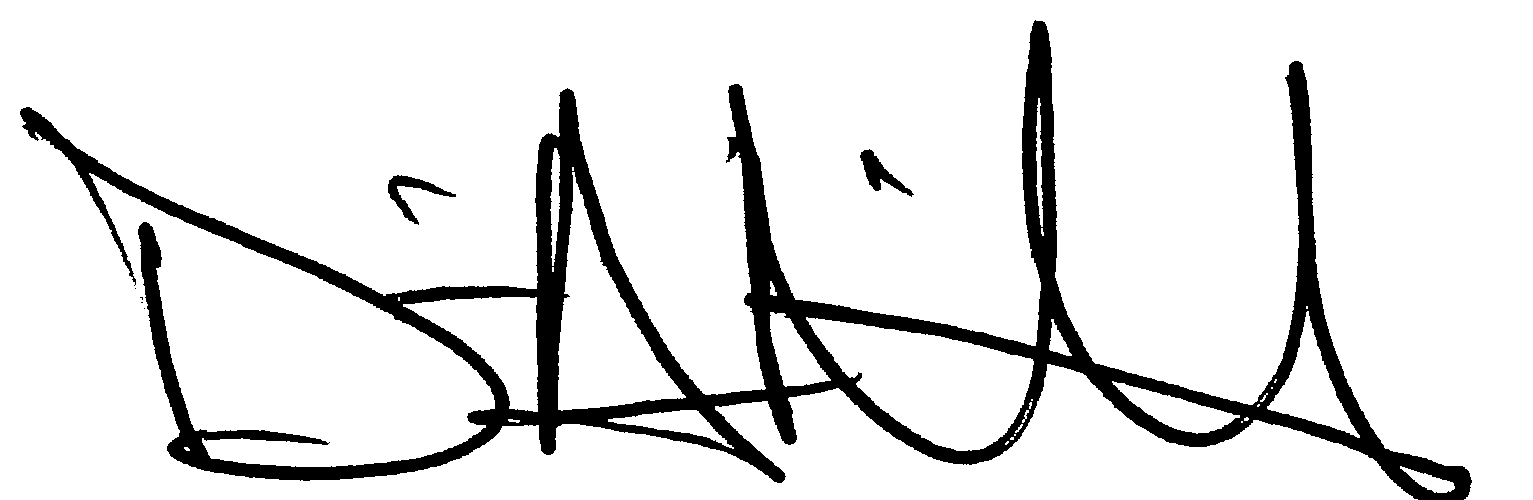

Dennis A. Muilenburg (born 1964) is an American engineer, business executive and a former president and chief executive officer (CEO) of Boeing, a multinational aerospace and defense company. He was CEO from 2015 to 2019, when he was fired in the aftermath of two crashes of the 737 MAX and its subsequent groundings.

Muilenburg was elected a member of the National Academy of Engineering in 2018 for leadership in defense, space, security, and commercial aircraft.

== Early life ==
Muilenburg grew up on a farm in Iowa.

He graduated in 1982 from Sioux Center High School in Sioux Center, Iowa. He received a bachelor's degree in aerospace engineering from Iowa State University, followed by a master's degree in aeronautics and astronautics from the University of Washington.

== Career ==
=== Boeing ===
Muilenburg started work at Boeing as an intern in 1985.

Muilenburg held numerous management and engineering positions on various Boeing programs, including the X-32 (Boeing's entry in the Joint Strike Fighter competition); Boeing's participation in the Lockheed Martin F-22 Raptor fighter; the YAL-1 747 Airborne Laser; the High Speed Civil Transport; and the Condor unmanned reconnaissance aircraft. He was later vice president of the Boeing combat systems division and program manager for the Army Future Combat Systems program. Muilenburg was president and chief executive officer of Boeing Integrated Defense Systems, later renamed Boeing Defense, Space & Security (BDS), from September 2009 to 2015.

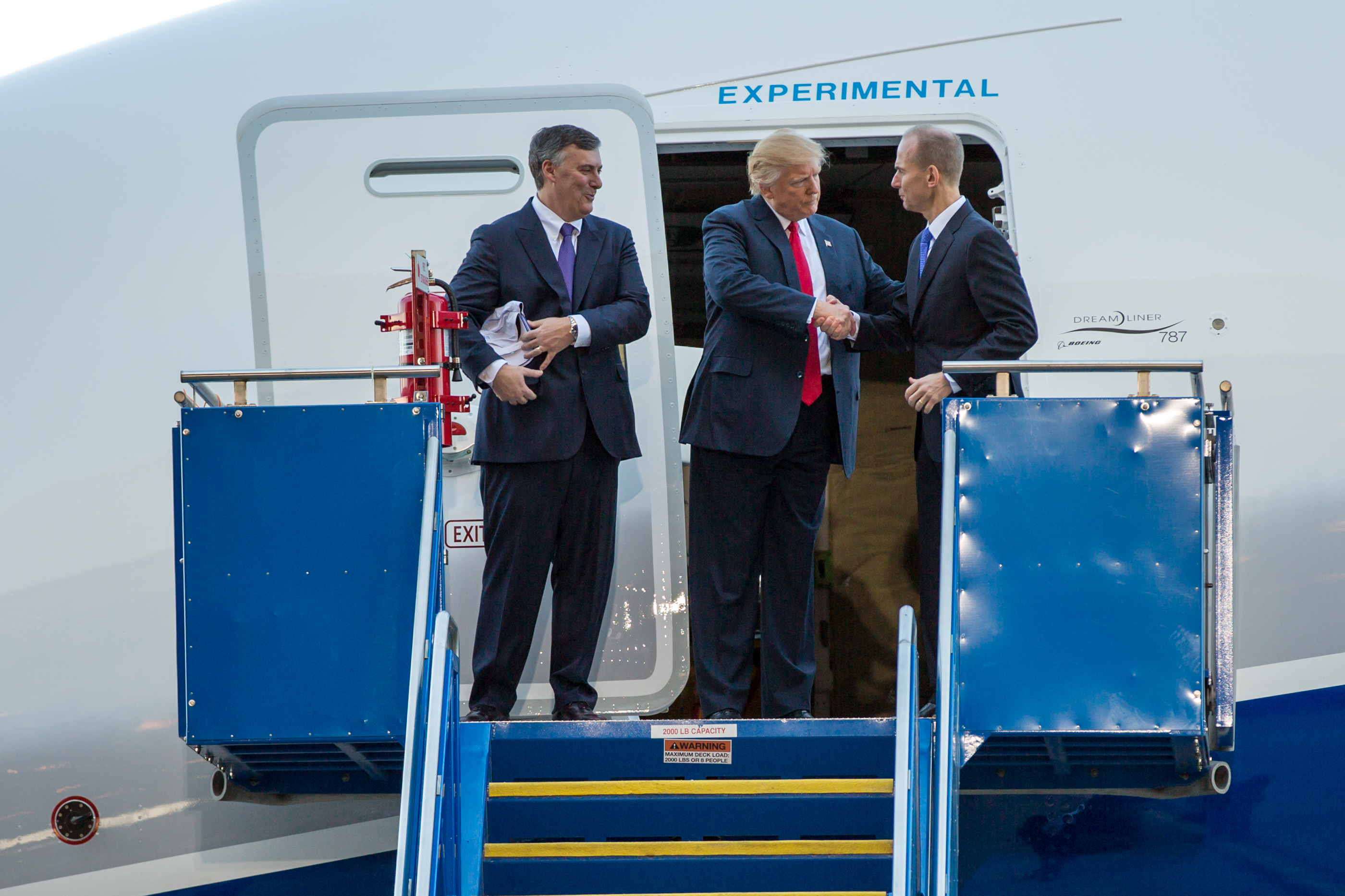
At the 787-10 Dreamliner rollout ceremony with President Donald Trump

In December 2013, Muilenburg became the president of Boeing.

In June 2015, Boeing announced that Muilenburg would succeed James McNerney as CEO, who was stepping down after ten years in that role. He became CEO in July 2015.

In February 2016, it was announced that Muilenburg would also succeed McNerney as Boeing's chairman. In March 2016, Muilenburg became the chairman of Boeing. In 2018, Muilenburg agreed to a fixed-price contract to deliver two customized 747 planes to the U.S. government which left Boeing with billions in losses. In March 2019, as a result of the Ethiopian Airlines Flight 302 crash and the Lion Air Flight 610 crash, which occurred five months prior to the Ethiopian crash, most airlines and countries began grounding the Boeing 737 MAX 8 due to safety concerns. On March 12, President Donald Trump spoke to Muilenburg and received assurances that the aircraft was safe. Trump grounded the 737 MAX family of planes on March 13.

In October 2019, Boeing announced that the board had voted to separate the roles of chairman and CEO, both of which were held by Muilenburg. David L. Calhoun would take over as non-executive chairman, while Muilenburg continued as CEO and president. The company said this change would enable Muilenburg to focus full-time on running the company, while it worked to return the Boeing 737 MAX to service.

In November 2019, Muilenburg confirmed that he would not be taking a bonus for the year, after being criticized for the two plane crashes, which killed a total of 346 people.

In December 2019, Boeing announced that Muilenburg resigned as the CEO and board director, in the aftermath of the two crashes of 737 MAX aircraft. Although he forfeited stock worth $14.6m, Muilenburg was contractually entitled to receive $62.2m in stock and pension awards.

This payment by Boeing attracted criticism. Michael Stumo, who lost his daughter in the Ethiopian Airlines crash, said, 'He was fired for poor performance, and he should be treated like any other production employee who gets fired for poor performance.' Zipporah Kuria lost her father Joseph and said, 'Nobody gets their benefits when they've screwed up this much. Muilenburg and my dad are, were, the same age. Two people, and one is a privileged person who gets away with having such a big part to play in the death of so many people, and the other who trusts a product and dies for it.' US Senator Elizabeth Warren wrote regarding the payment by Boeing, '346 people died. And yet, Dennis Muilenburg pressured regulators and put profits ahead of the safety of passengers, pilots, and flight attendants. He'll walk away with an additional $62.2 million. This is corruption, plain and simple.'

He was succeeded as CEO and president by David L. Calhoun, effective January 2020. During the transition, CFO Greg Smith was interim CEO. Boeing's press release stated that, "The Board of Directors decided that a change in leadership was necessary to restore confidence in the Company moving forward as it works to repair relationships with regulators, customers, and all other stakeholders."

In January 2020, Caterpillar Inc. announced that Muilenburg had resigned from its board (which he joined in 2011), and stated in a regulatory filing that his resignation was not due to any disagreement with the company.

In December 2020, Muilenburg joined Monarch Tractor, a Livermore, California-based electric tractor startup, as an investor and advisor.

=== New Vista Capital ===
Muilenberg is co-founder and CEO of an early stage investment firm, New Vista Capital, a firm that invests in the aerospace and defense sector.

== Memberships ==
=== Board memberships ===
Current

- Trustee, The National WWII Museum
- Chairman of the Board, Otto Aviation
- Board member, Westwin Elements

Previous

- Board member, US-China Business Council
- Trustee, Northwestern University
- Trustee, Washington University in St. Louis
- Board member, Caterpillar Inc.
- Board member, The Boeing Company, until he resigned on December 23, 2019, as President, CEO and board member in the aftermath of the 737 Max crashes
- Chairman of the board, The Boeing Company
- Vice-chairman of the board, The Boeing Company
- Chairman of the board, Aerospace Industries Association
- Board member, Aerospace Industries Association

=== Other memberships ===
- Member, Business Roundtable
- Member, Association of the United States Army
- Member, National Space Council Users Advisory Group
- Member, National Academy of Engineering

== Personal life ==
Muilenburg cycles about 120 miles per week around the Chicago area, where Boeing was formerly headquartered.

Muilenburg is married with two children. He is a Baptist.

== Awards ==
- Fellow, Royal Aeronautical Society
- Honorary Fellow, American Institute of Aeronautics and Astronautics
- John W. Dixon Award (2017), Association of the United States Army
- CEO of the Year Award (2018), Thurgood Marshall College Fund
- Dean's Award (2018), University of Washington College of Engineering
- Person of the Year (2018), Aviation Week

Business positions
Preceded by James McNerney	CEO of Boeing; 2015 – 2019	Succeeded by David Calhoun
