= Dave Calhoun =

American businessman (born 1957)

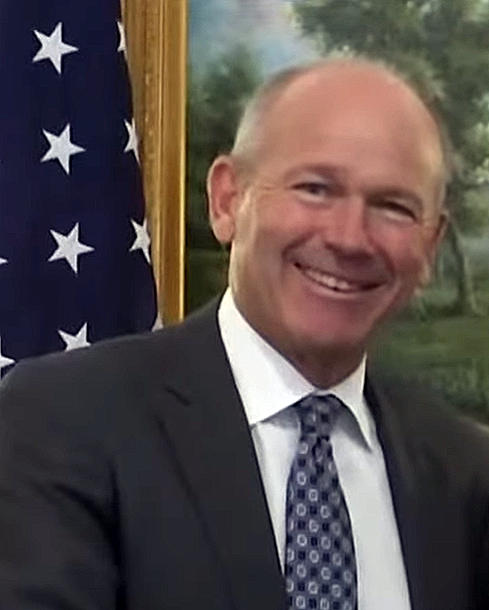
- Calhoun in 2023
- Born: David L. Calhoun; April 18, 1957 (age 69); Philadelphia, Pennsylvania, U.S.
- Education: Virginia Tech (BS)
- Title: Former President and CEO, Boeing
- Term: January 2020 – August 2024
- Predecessor: Dennis Muilenburg
- Successor: Kelly Ortberg

David L. Calhoun (born April 18, 1957) is an American executive who was the president and chief executive of Boeing from January 2020 to August 7, 2024. In March 2024, Boeing announced that Calhoun would step down as chief executive by the end of 2024.

He was previously Boeing's chairman and was appointed CEO after his predecessor Dennis Muilenburg was fired amid safety concerns with the Boeing 737 MAX following two fatal crashes that claimed the lives of 346 passengers and crew on board.

== Early life and education ==
Calhoun was born April 18, 1957, in Allentown and grew up in Allentown, Pennsylvania. He attended Parkland High School in South Whitehall Township, Pennsylvania, graduating in 1975. In high school, Calhoun was one of three captains of the varsity basketball team and played golf. He attended Virginia Tech where he was a member of Delta Kappa Epsilon, graduating in 1979 with a degree in accounting.

== Career ==
After graduating from college, Calhoun was hired by General Electric (GE). He decided to join GE in part because he would be working in Lehigh Valley in eastern Pennsylvania, where he grew up. He worked at GE for 26 years, overseeing transportation, aircraft engines, reinsurance, lighting and other GE units, before being appointed vice chairman and a member of GE's Board of Directors in 2005.

Calhoun left GE to join privately held global information services firm VNU as CEO in 2006. Under his leadership, the company rebranded itself as Nielsen Holdings, returned to the public markets in 2011, and was added to the S&P 500 Index in 2013. In 2014, Calhoun became executive chairman of Nielsen, and also joined The Blackstone Group as a Senior Managing Director and head of Private Equity Portfolio Operations. He also became a member of Blackstone's management committee.

At Boeing, Calhoun was a director, starting in 2009, and was named lead independent director in 2018. The company separated the roles of chairman and chief executive officer in the fall of 2019 so that Muilenburg could "implement changes to sharpen Boeing's focus on product and services safety", according to a press release. At the same time, the board named Calhoun non-executive chairman.

In March 2024, Boeing announced that Calhoun would be stepping down at the end of the year.

=== Public comments on accidents involving Boeing aircraft ===
In a March 2020 interview with The New York Times, Calhoun discussed the 737 MAX's MCAS software, saying that Boeing had made a "fatal mistake" in expecting that pilots could immediately correct the software problems. He went on to explain that "pilots [in Ethiopia and Indonesia] don't have anywhere near the experience that they have here in the U.S." He unsuccessfully requested to go off the record after being asked whether American pilots would have been able to control the situation, and then replied, "[f]orget it, you can guess the answer."

On January 5, 2024, a door plug on a Boeing 737 MAX 9 aircraft operated by Alaska Airlines (Alaska Airlines Flight 1282) blew out, causing an uncontrolled decompression. The aircraft returned to Portland, Oregon, for an emergency landing. There were no fatalities. The National Transportation Safety Board and the FAA announced investigations. At a staff meeting on January 9, Calhoun acknowledged Boeing's responsibility. "We are gonna approach this—No. 1—acknowledging our mistake", he told employees. Calhoun added that he had been "shaken to the bone" by the accident.

=== Cancellation of NMA ===
Under the direction of Calhoun, Boeing cancelled the New Midsize Airplane (NMA) in early 2020, and quashed any notion that it may develop an all-new airliner late in the 2020s, which meant Boeing had nothing to compete with Airbus and its A321neo. Airlines responded by ordering Airbus A321neo in record numbers. There were over 1300 A321neo orders over the next twelve months after the Boeing announcement.

=== Boeing compensation ===
In 2022, Calhoun received $22.5 million from Boeing. Most of his 2022 compensation was in the form of estimated value of stock and option awards. He received the same $1.4 million salary as in 2021.

Boeing announced in March 2023 that Calhoun would not receive a $7 million performance-based bonus, which had been tied to getting the new widebody 777X into service by the end of 2023.

In February 2023, Boeing awarded Calhoun an incentive of about $5.29 million in restricted stock units to "induce him to stay throughout the company's recovery". In March 2023, Boeing announced Calhoun was being given shares worth $15 million that will vest in installments over three years.

== Personal life ==
Calhoun and his wife, Barbara, have four children.

== Philanthropy ==
In 2018, Calhoun gave $20 million to Virginia Tech to create the Calhoun Honors Discovery Program.
