= Delta Air Lines fleet =

List of aircraft operated by Delta Air Lines

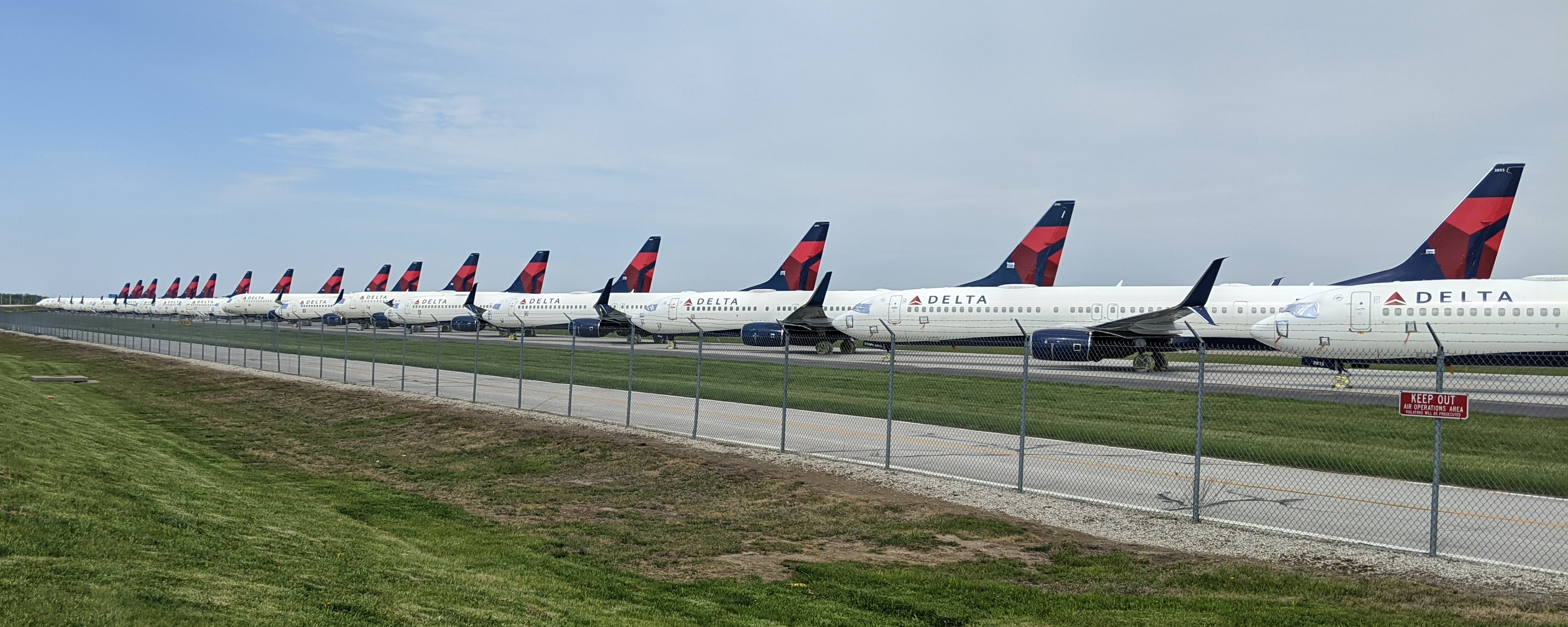
Delta Air Lines aircraft parked on a taxiway at Kansas City International Airport during the COVID-19 pandemic

The Delta Air Lines fleet consists of 1,005 mainline aircraft, making it the third largest commercial airline fleet in the world. Prior to its 2008 merger with Northwest Airlines, Delta mostly operated aircraft built in the United States. The merger introduced Airbus models, now the majority, into Delta’s fleet. Historically, Delta has favored used and older-generation aircraft to lower acquisition costs. Its in-house MRO division, Delta TechOps, plays a key role in efficiently managing the complexity of this diverse fleet, while also generating revenue servicing aircraft and engines for other airlines. Delta operates the world's largest passenger subfleets of Airbus A220, Boeing 717, Boeing 757, Boeing 767, and Airbus A330 aircraft. Wide-body aircraft including the Airbus A330, Airbus A350, and Boeing 767, are deployed on long-haul routes to Europe, Asia, Africa, Oceania, and South America. As of September 2026, Delta's average fleet age is 14.9 years.

== Fleet renewal ==
As of December 2024, Delta continued to refresh its fleet of 975 mainline and 317 regional aircraft with orders of 294 new and more fuel-efficient aircraft with increased premium seating and cargo capacity to replace retiring aircraft, while modifying existing aircraft cabins to increase premium offerings and harmonize interiors. Since its merger with Northwest Airlines, Delta has retired its Boeing 737-700, 747-200 (freighters), 747-400, 777, and its McDonnell Douglas DC-9, MD-88, and MD-90 sub-fleets. During that time, Delta made innovative deals, including a lease of 88 used Boeing 717 aircraft from Boeing and Southwest Airlines in 2012, an order for 75 Bombardier CS100 (now Airbus A220-100) aircraft in April 2016 at a steep discount for less than $20m each, well below their $33.2m production cost, which led Boeing to accuse the manufacturer of dumping the aircraft, and the acquisition of purchase rights for 10 LATAM Airlines Airbus A350 aircraft on order as part of a deal to acquire a 20% equity stake in LATAM Airlines Group in September 2019.

== Fleet ==
As of September 2026, Delta Air Lines operates the following mainline aircraft:

Delta Air Lines fleet
Aircraft	In service		Orders	Passengers							Notes
Aircraft	In service		Orders	J	F	W	Y+	Y	Total	Refs	Notes
Airbus A220-100	45		—	—	12	—	15	82	109		Replacing Boeing 717.
Airbus A220-300	47		53	—	12	—	30	88	130		Replacing Boeing 717.
Airbus A319-100	57		—	—	12	—	18	102	132		
Airbus A320-200	40		—	—	16	—	18	123	157		
Airbus A321-200	127		—	—	20	—	29	142	191		
Airbus A321neo	106		83	16	—	12	54	66	148		Order with 36 options.
Airbus A321neo	106		83	—	20	—	60	114	194		Order with 36 options.
Airbus A321neo	106		83	—	44	—	54	66	164		Temporary configuration.
Airbus A330-200	11		—	34	—	21	24	144	223		
Airbus A330-300	31		—	34	—	21	24	203	282		
Airbus A330-900	39		16	29	—	28	56	168	281		Order with 20 options. Deliveries begin 2029.
Airbus A350-900	41	24	17	40	—	40	36	159	275		Order with 20 options. Deliveries begin 2029.
Airbus A350-900	41	17	17	32	—	48	36	190	306		Order with 20 options. Deliveries begin 2029.
Airbus A350-1000	—		20	53	—	48	51	162	314		Order with 10 options. Deliveries begin 2027.
Boeing 717-200	74		—	—	12	—	20	78	110		Largest operator. To be retired by 2030. Being replaced with the Airbus A220.
Boeing 737-800	77		—	—	16	—	54	90	160		
Boeing 737-900ER	163	130	—	—	20	—	21	139	180		
Boeing 737-900ER	163	21	—	—	12	—	24	137	173		
Boeing 737-900ER	163	12	—	—	12	—	6	162	180		
Boeing 737 MAX 10	—		100	—	20	—	33	129	182		Order with 30 options. Deliveries begin 2027.
Boeing 757-200	72	12	—	16	—	—	44	108	168		Transcontinental configuration. Older aircraft to be retired.
Boeing 757-200	72	6	—	—	20	—	41	132	193		Older aircraft to be retired.
Boeing 757-200	72	43	—	—	20	—	29	150	199		Older aircraft to be retired.
Boeing 757-200	72	11	—	—	72	—	—	—	72		Charter configuration.
Boeing 757-300	16		—	—	24	—	32	178	234		
Boeing 767-300ER	37	5	—	36	—	—	32	143	211		To be retired by 2030.
Boeing 767-300ER	37	32	—	26	—	18	21	151	216		To be retired by 2030.
Boeing 767-400ER	21		—	34	—	20	28	156	238		
Boeing 787-10	—		30	TBA							Order with 30 options. Deliveries begin 2031.
Total	1,005		319								

=== Gallery ===
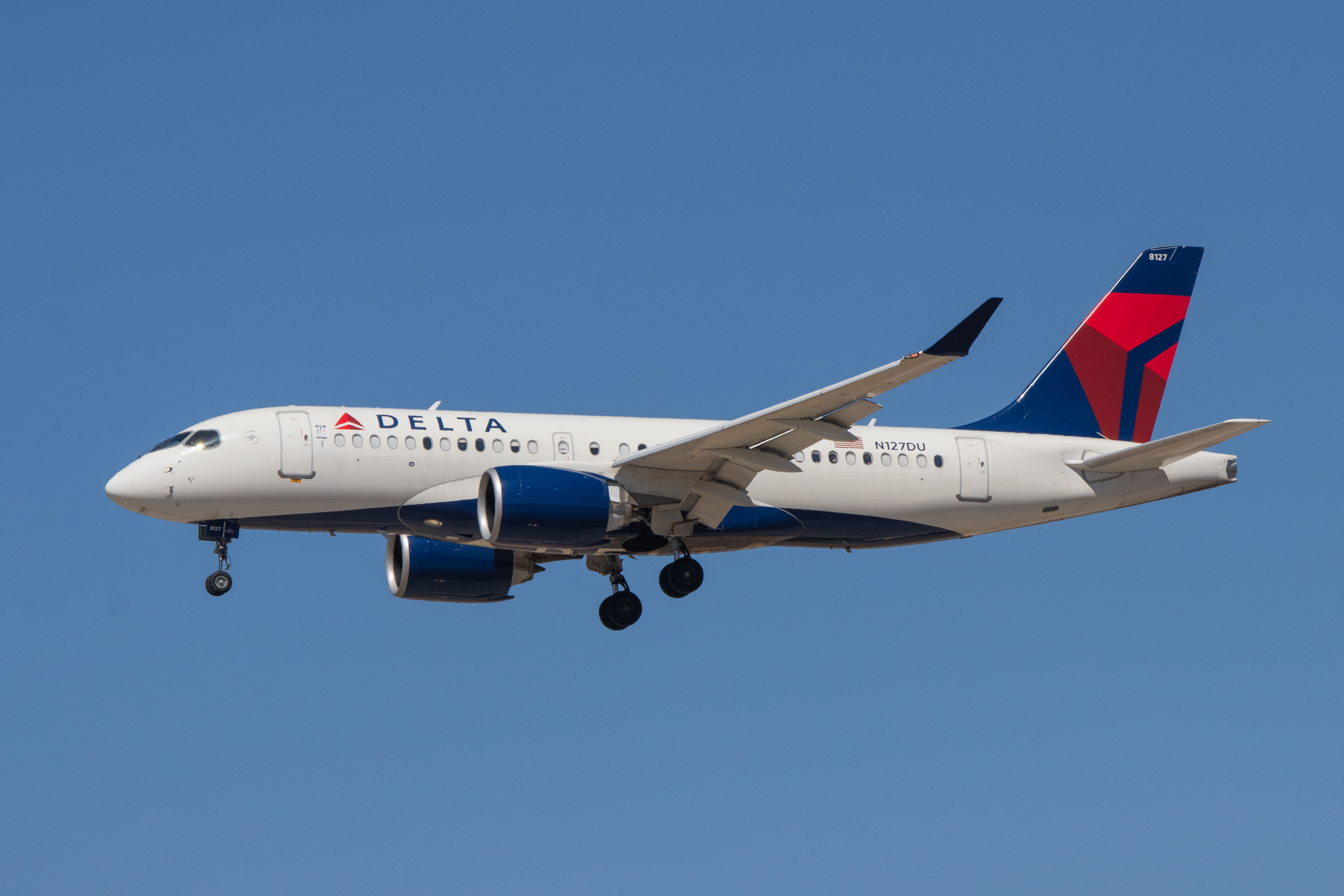
Airbus A220-100

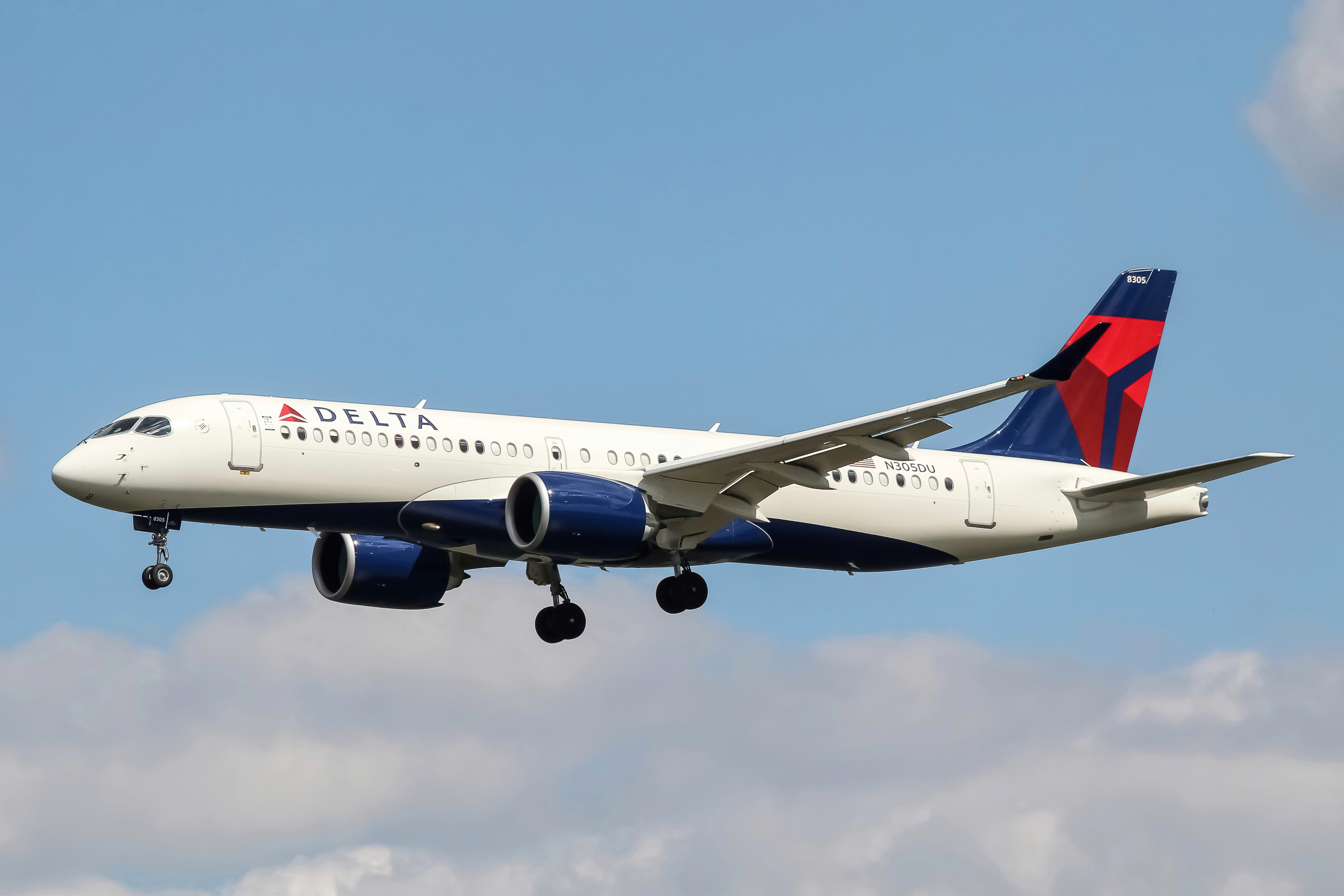
Airbus A220-300

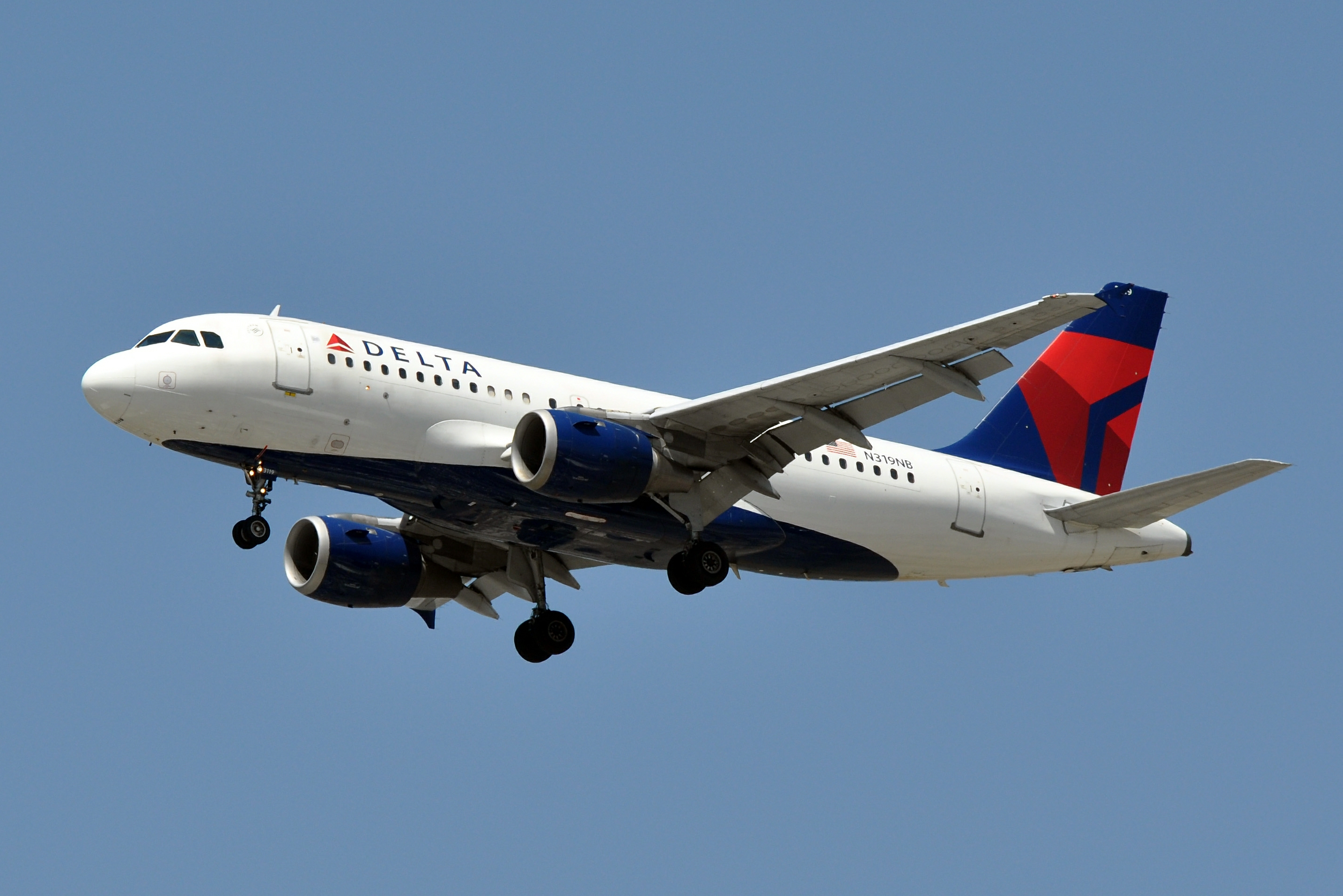
Airbus A319-100

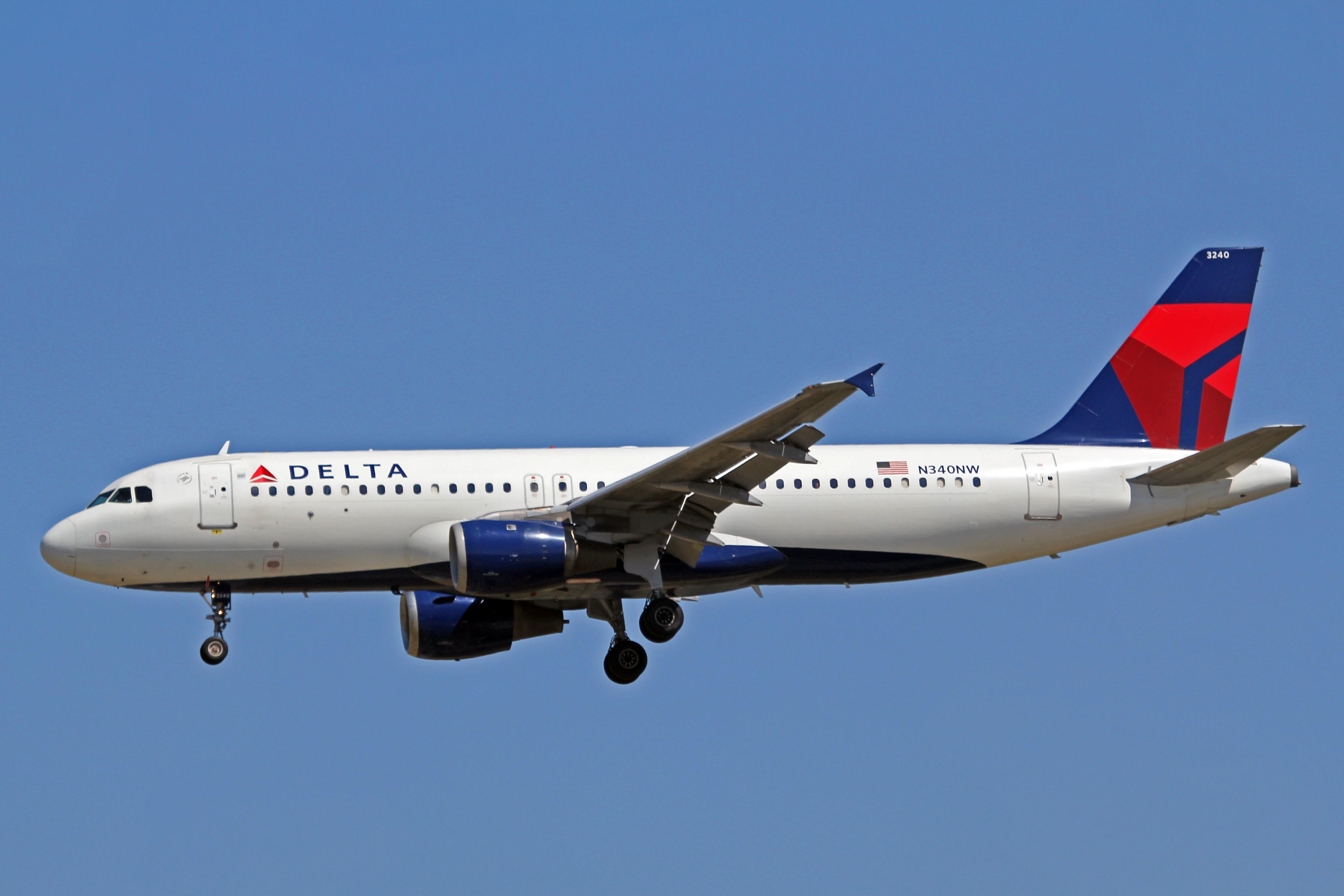
Airbus A320-200

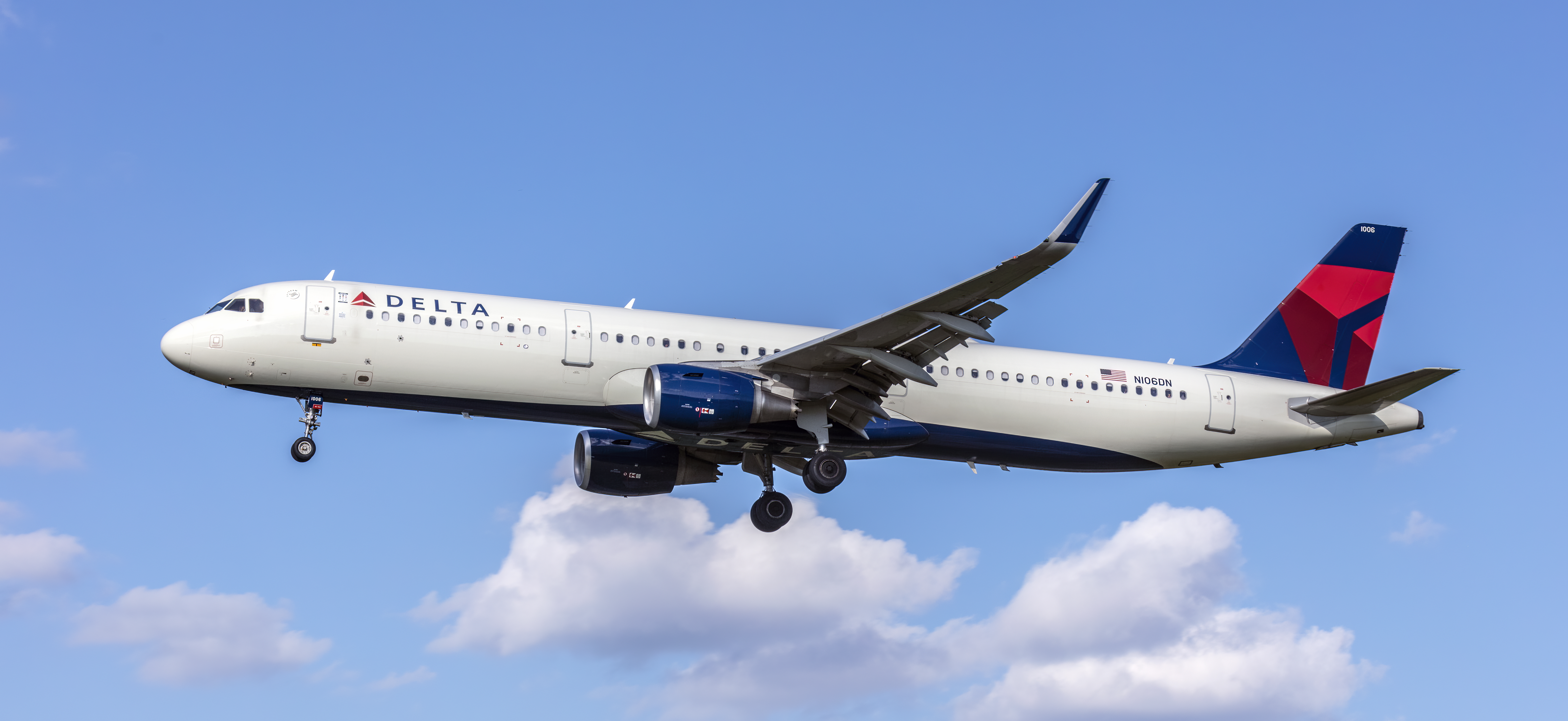
Airbus A321-200

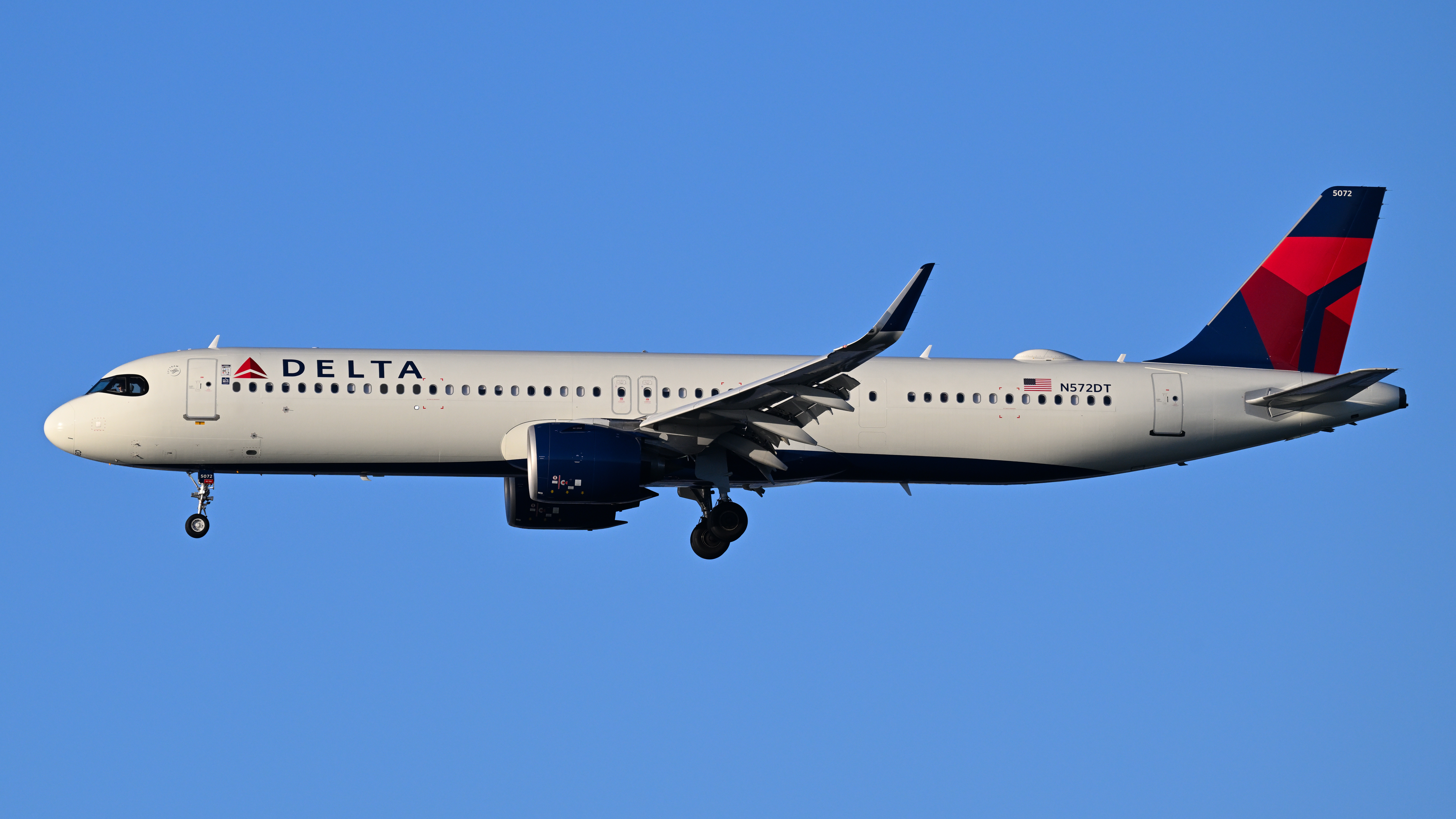
Airbus A321neo

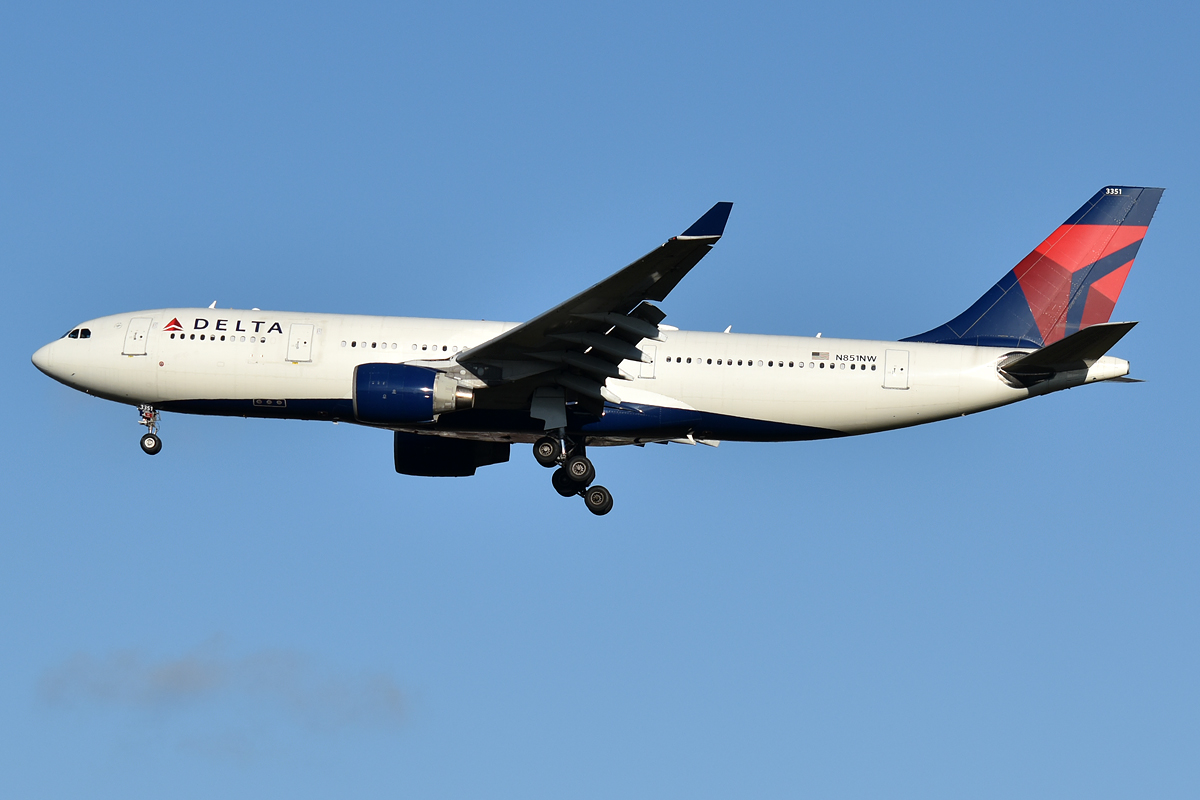
Airbus A330-200

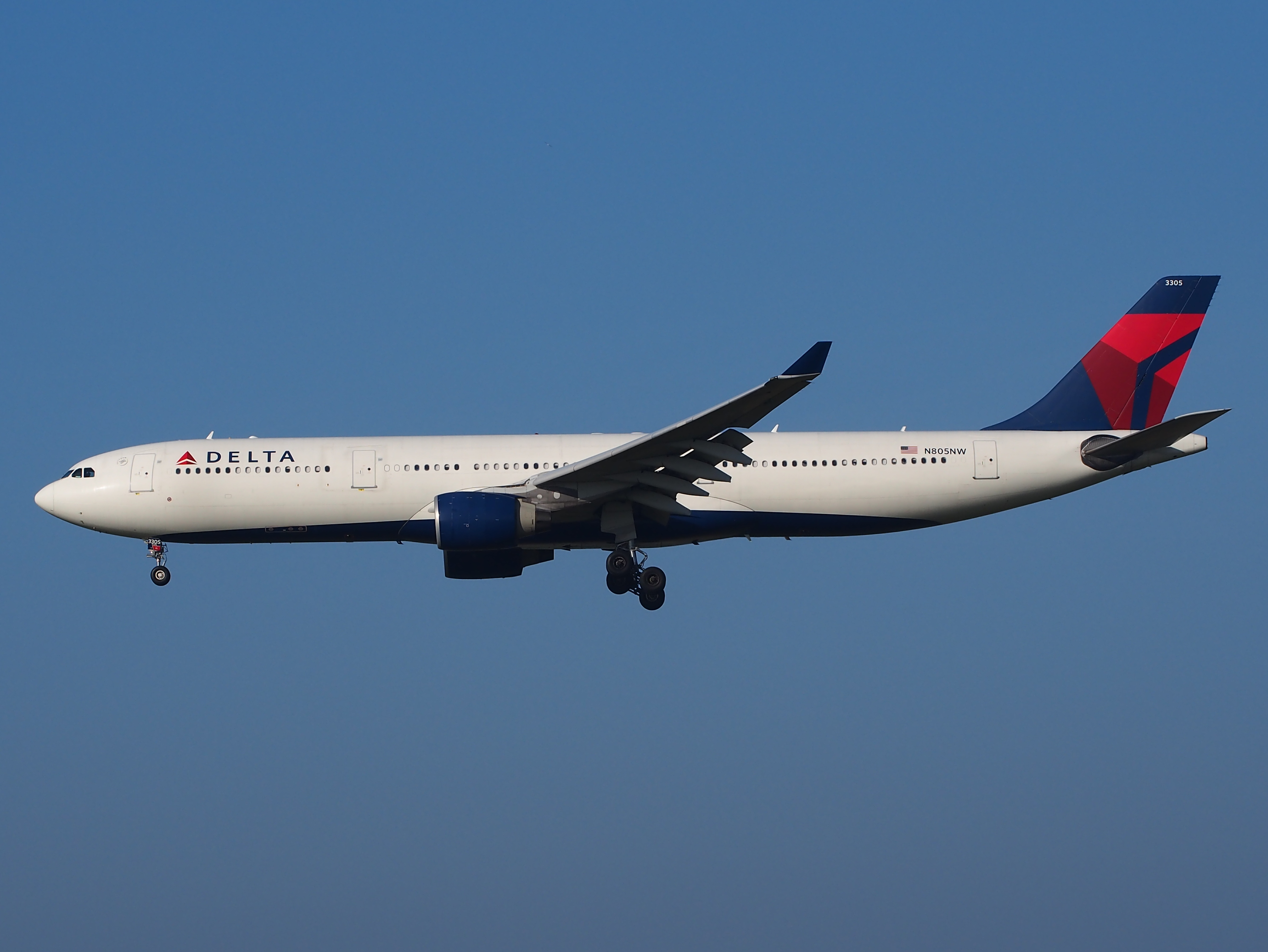
Airbus A330-300

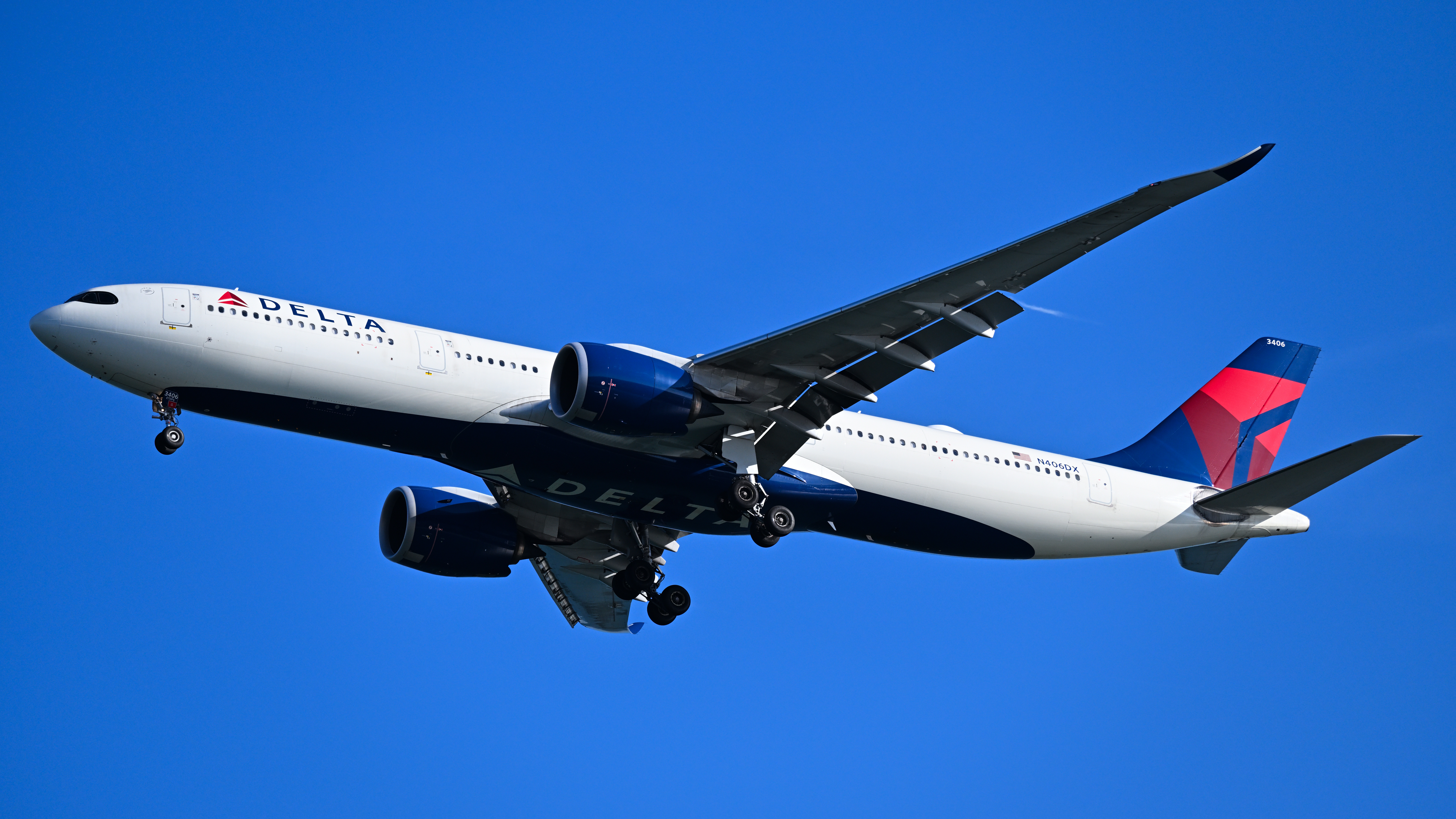
Airbus A330-900

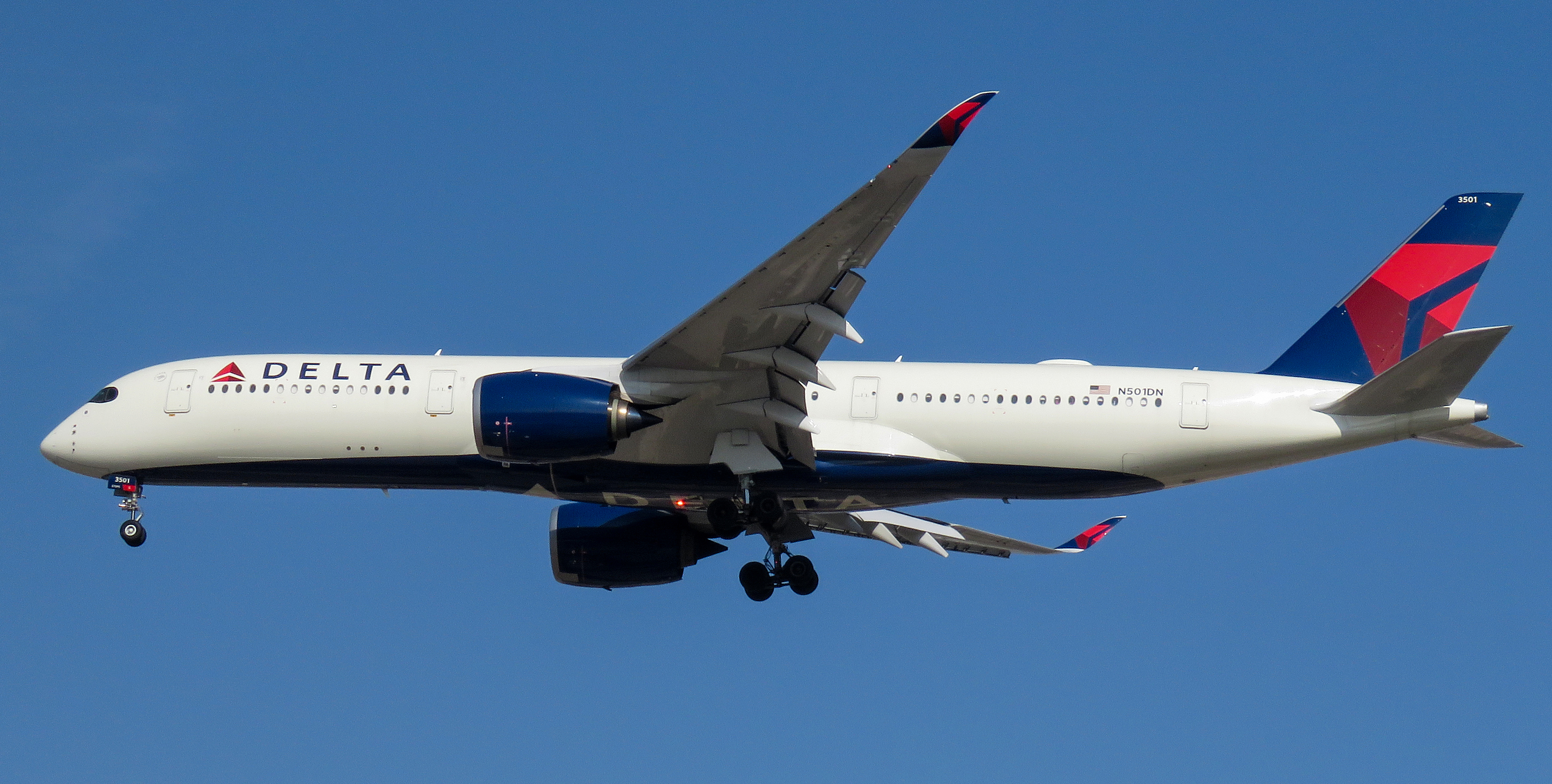
Airbus A350-900

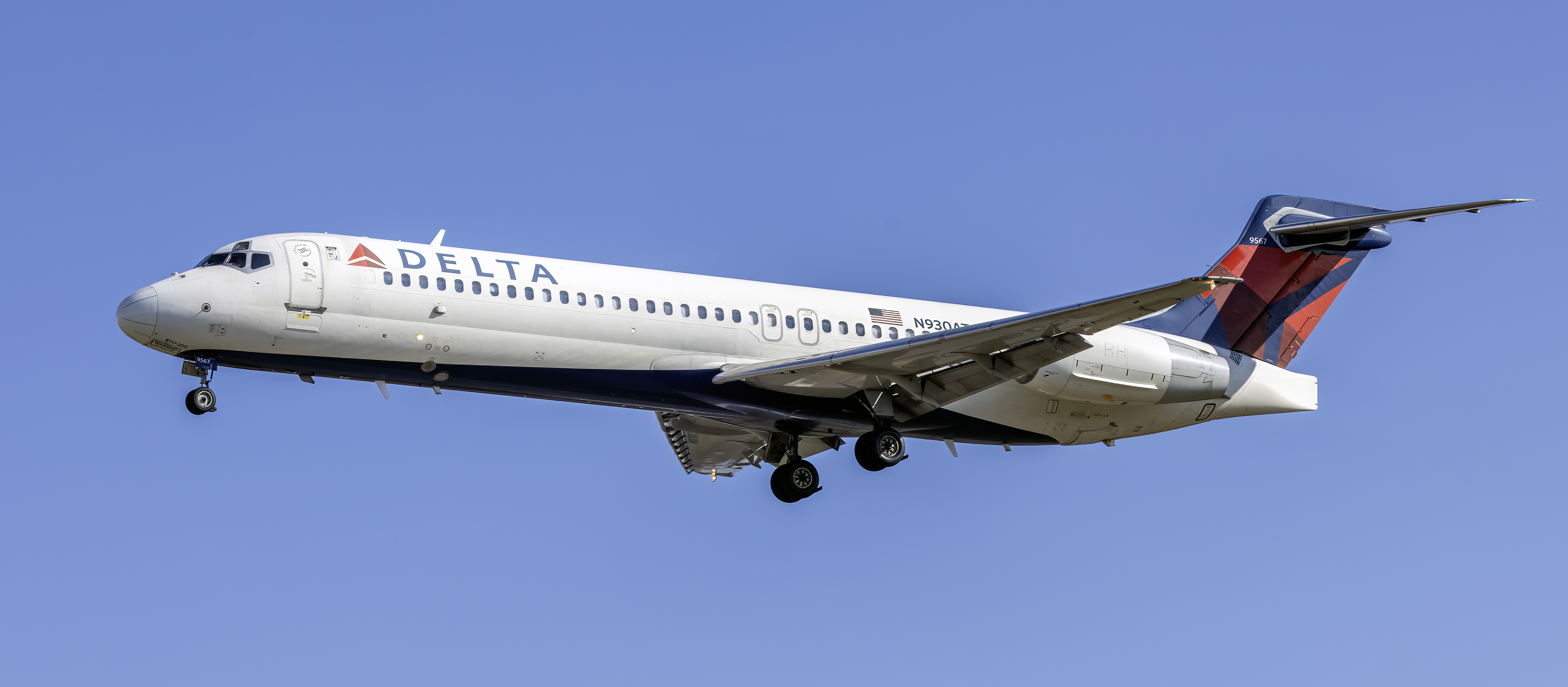
Boeing 717-200

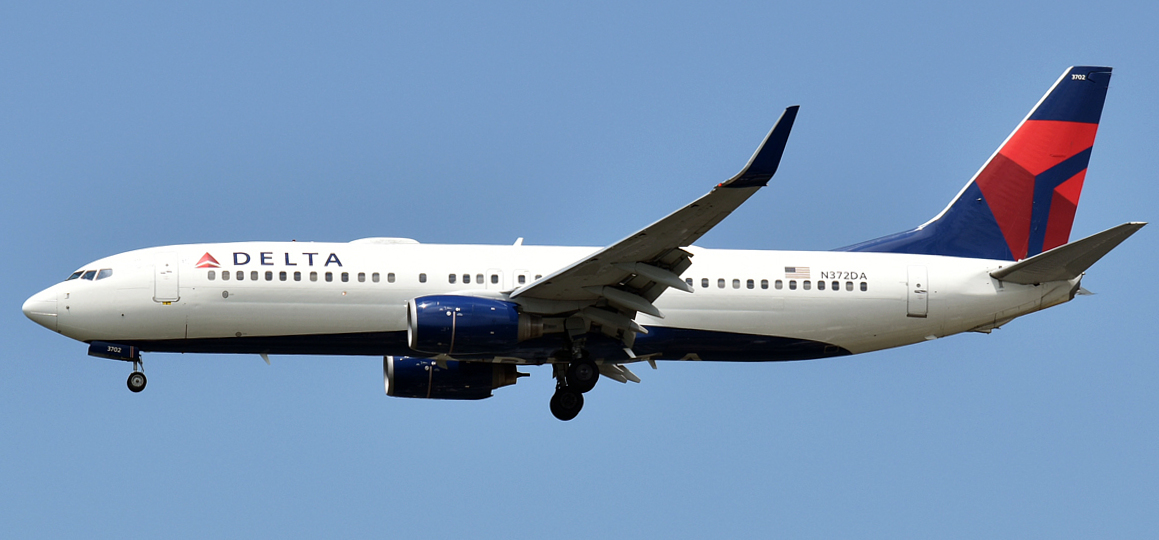
Boeing 737-800

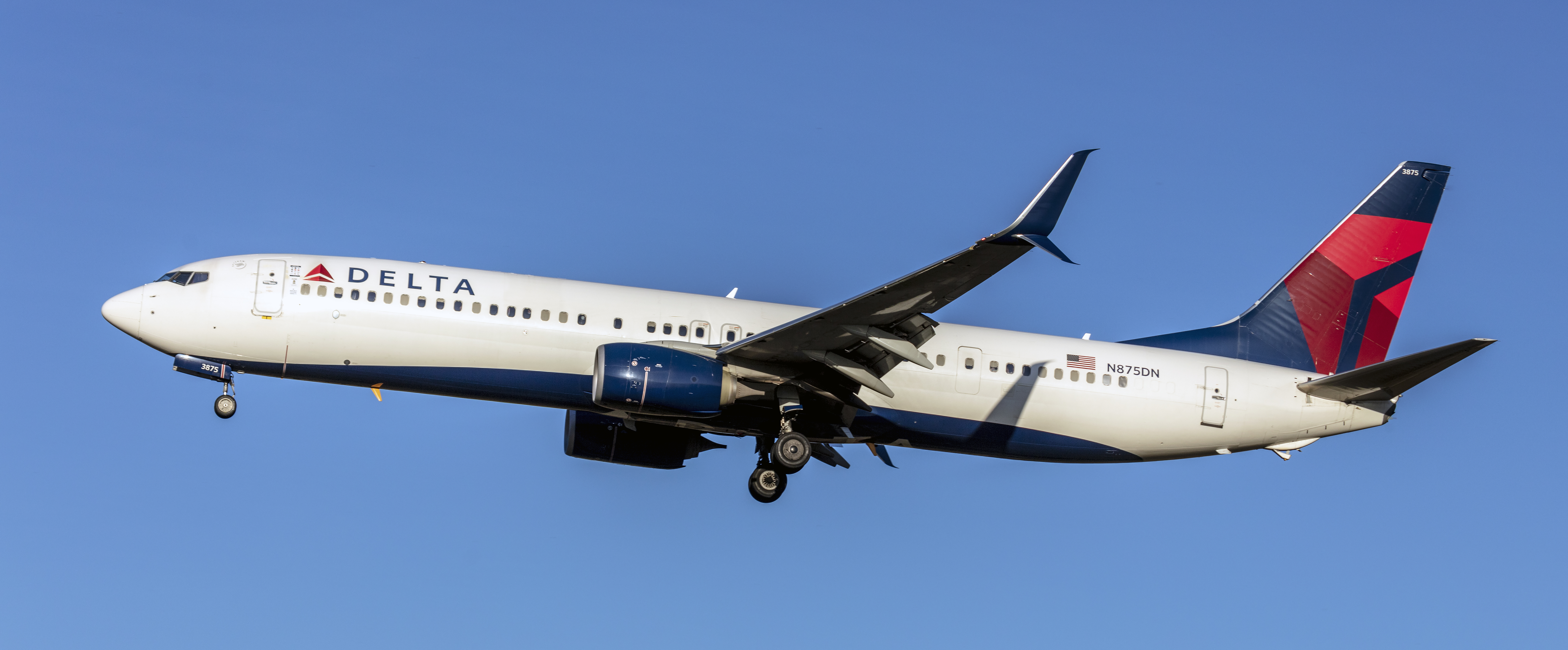
Boeing 737-900ER

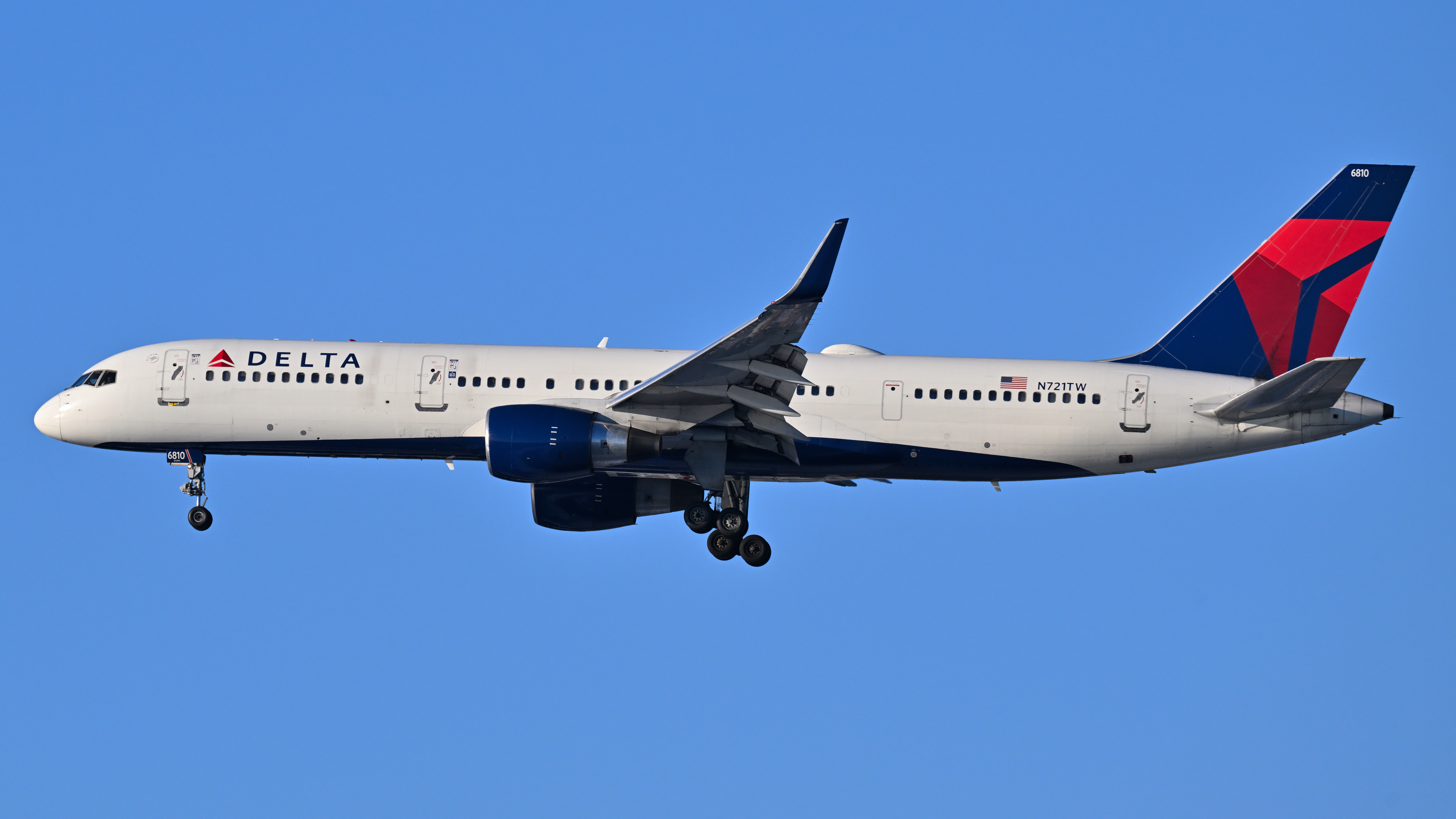
Boeing 757-200

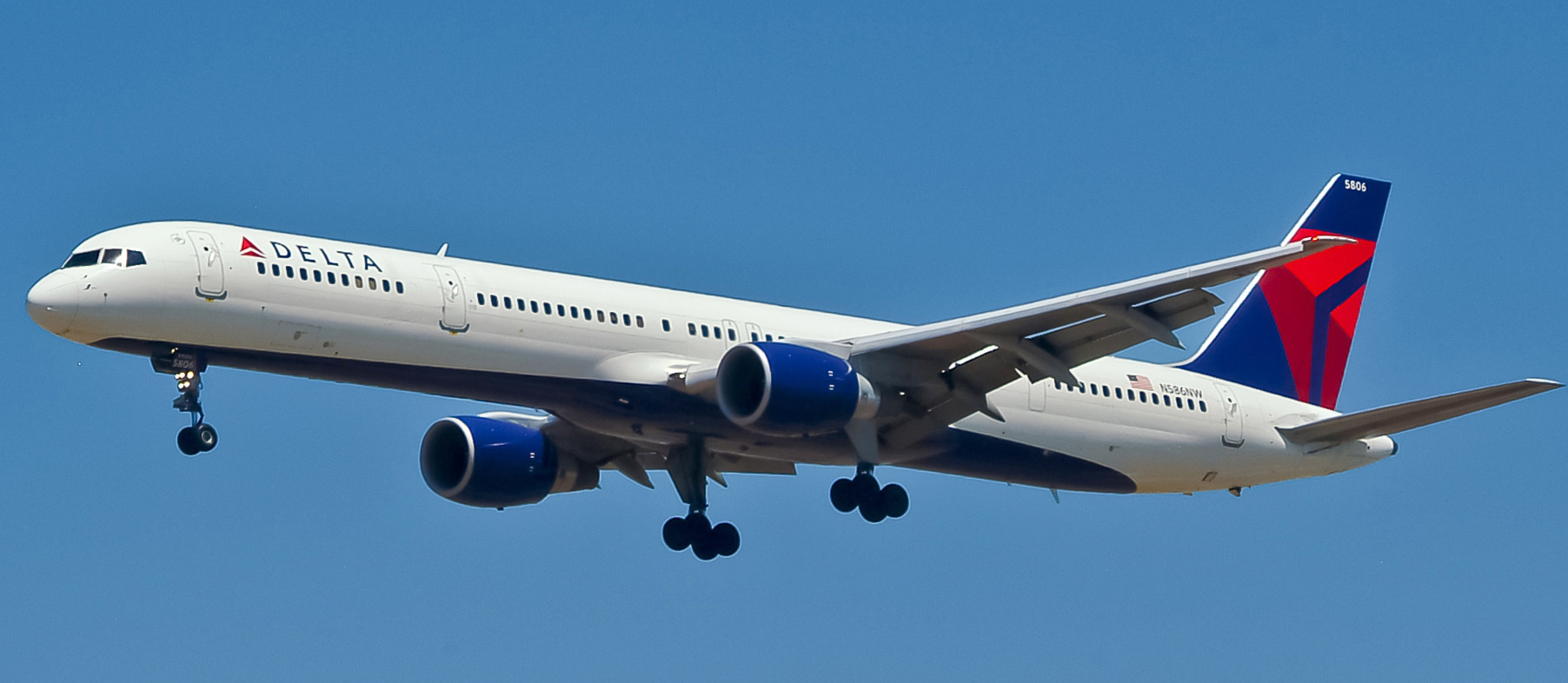
Boeing 757-300

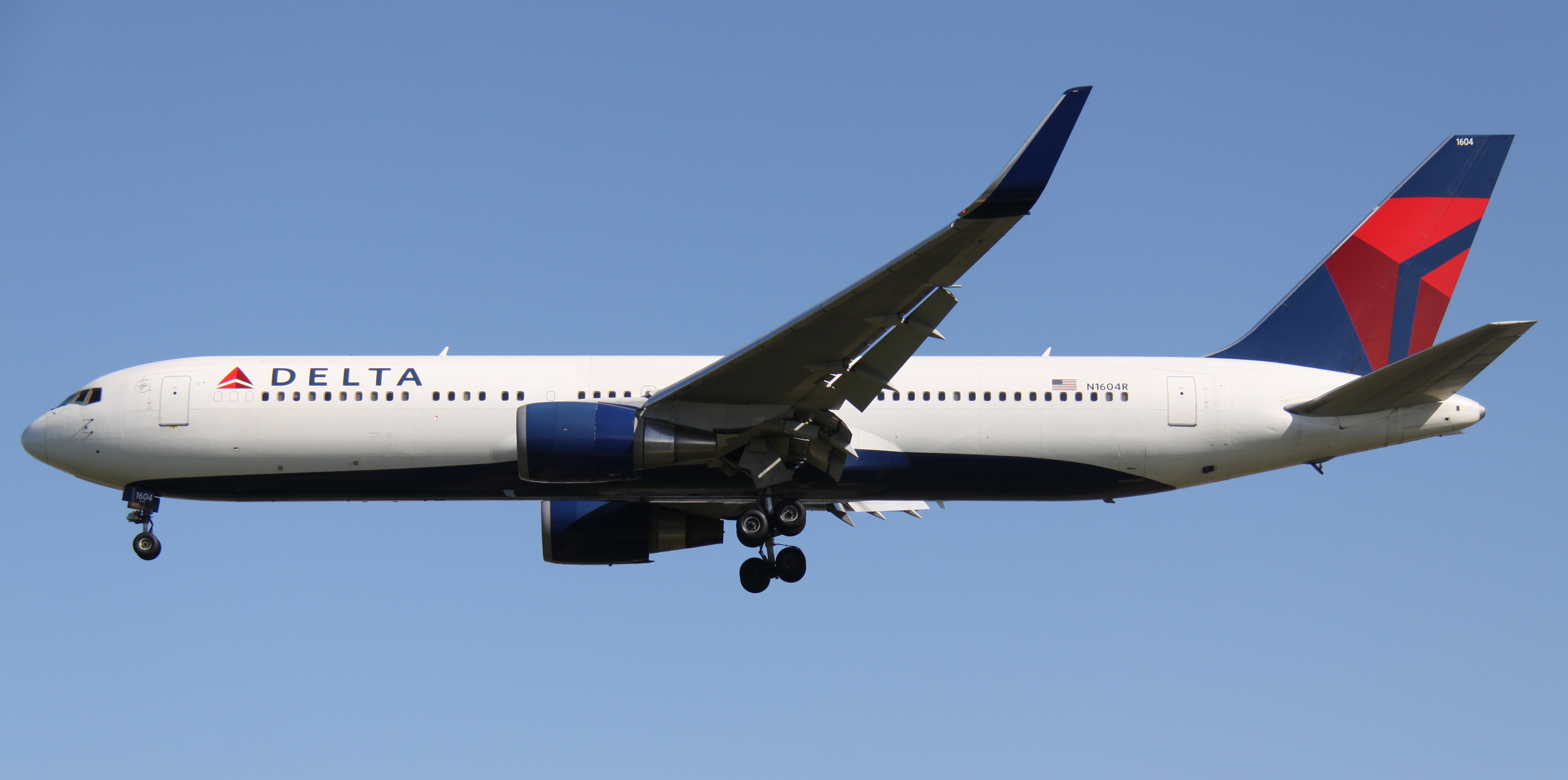
Boeing 767-300ER

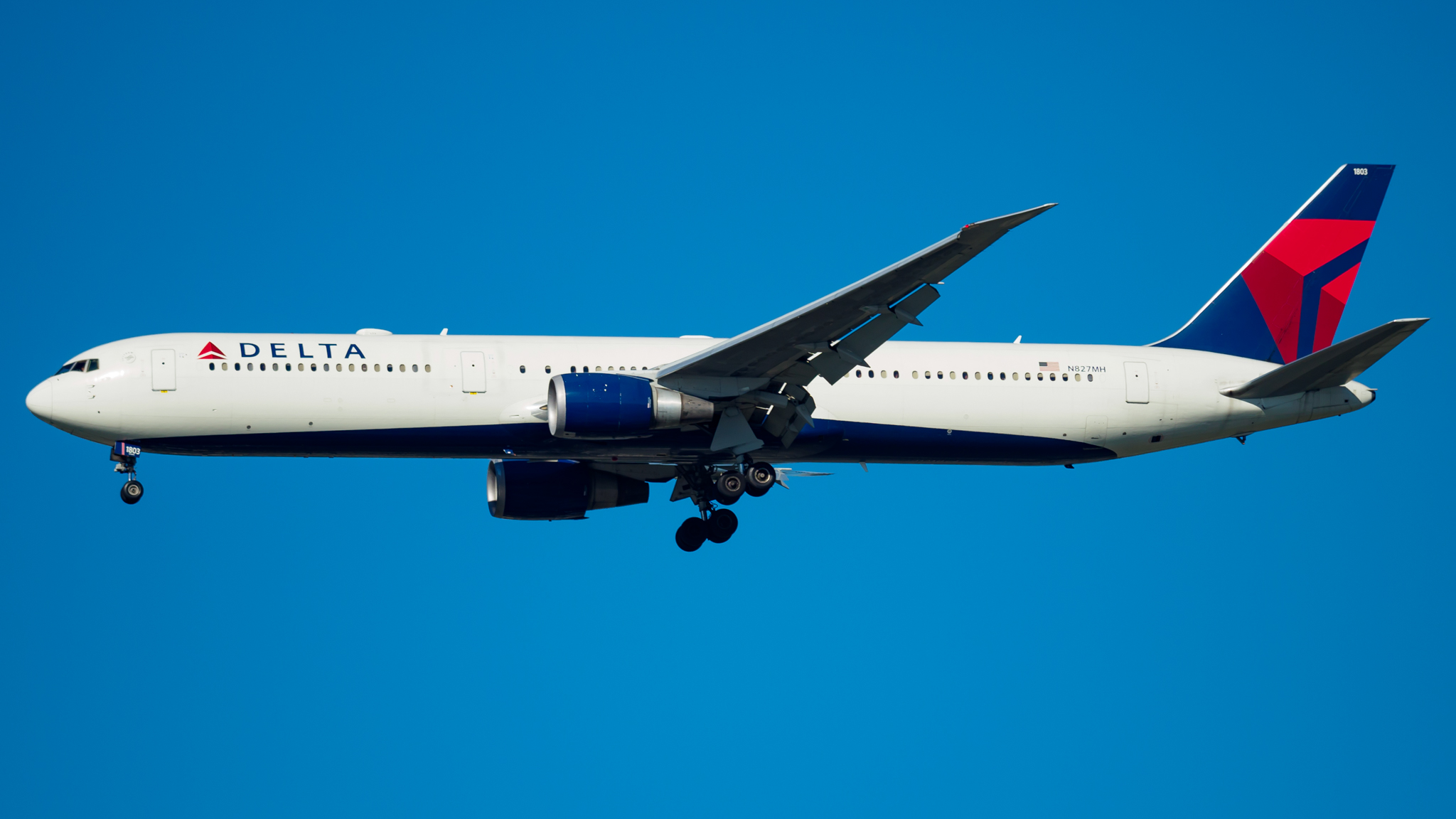
Boeing 767-400ER

== Fleet history ==
Delta Air Lines retired fleet
Aircraft	Total	Introduced	Retired	Replacement	Notes
Airbus A310-200	9	1991	1995	Boeing 767-300ER	Former Pan American World Airways fleet.
Airbus A310-300	23	1991	1996	Boeing 767-300ER	Former Pan American World Airways fleet.
Boeing 727-100	8	1972	1977	Boeing 727-200	Former Northeast Airlines fleet.
Boeing 727-200	183	1972	2003	Boeing 737-800; Boeing 757-200; McDonnell Douglas MD-90	One crashed as Flight 1141.
Boeing 737-200	75	1983	2006	Boeing 737-800; McDonnell Douglas MD-88; McDonnell Douglas MD-90	One damaged as Flight 1581.
Boeing 737-300	31	1987	2006	Boeing 737-800	
Boeing 737-700	10	2008	2020	Airbus A220; Airbus A319-100	Early retirement due to the COVID-19 pandemic.
Boeing 747-100	5	1970	1977	Lockheed L-1011 TriStar	Early retirement due to the 1970s energy crisis.
Boeing 747-400	16	2008	2018	Airbus A350-900	Former Northwest Airlines fleet. Last major passenger 747 operator in North America. N661US ship 6301, the first 747-400 is displayed at the Delta Flight Museum. The aircraft was involved in a rudder hardover incident in 2002.
Boeing 767-200	15	1982	2006	Boeing 737-800; Boeing 757-200; Boeing 767-300ER	N102DA ship 102 named The Spirit Of Delta, is displayed at the Delta Flight Museum.
Boeing 767-300	28	1986	2019	Airbus A321-200; Boeing 737-900ER; Boeing 767-300ER	
Boeing 777-200ER	8	1999	2020	Airbus A330-900; Airbus A350	Early retirement due to the COVID-19 pandemic.
Boeing 777-200LR	10	2008	2020	Airbus A330-900; Airbus A350	Early retirement due to the COVID-19 pandemic.
Convair CV-240 family	18	1953	1970	McDonnell Douglas DC-9	Originally decided to buy Martin 2-0-2s but in 1951 ordered ten CV-340s instead. Eight CV-440s were delivered from 1956 and Delta modified retrospectively its 340s to 440s.
Convair CV-240 family	10	1953	1970	McDonnell Douglas DC-9	Ordered by Chicago and Southern Air Lines were delivered to Delta due to their merger in 1953.
Convair CV-880	17	1960	1973	Boeing 727-200	One written off as Flight 954.
Curtiss C-46 Commando	5	1957	1967	Lockheed L-100	
Douglas DC-2	4	1940	1941	Unknown	Acquired from American Airlines. First Douglas aircraft to join the Delta fleet.
Douglas DC-3	21	1940	1960	Convair CV-240 family	
Douglas DC-3	3	1940	1960	Curtiss C-46 Commando	Acquired after World War II and operated between 1946 and 1957.
Douglas DC-6	12	1949	1968	Douglas DC-8; McDonnell Douglas DC-9	Passenger amenities included a six-person lounge in the rear of the cabin and two pairs of aft-facing seats in the forward cabin.
Douglas DC-7	11	1954	1968	Douglas DC-8	
Douglas DC-7B	10	1954	1968	Douglas DC-8	
Douglas DC-8-11	22	1959	1981	Boeing 727-200	Operated the world's first scheduled DC-8 service (from New York to Atlanta) on September 18, 1959. DC-8-11s were converted to -12s then further converted to -51s. One crashed at Flight 9877. Two hijacked as Flight 841 and Flight 821.
Douglas DC-8-12	22	1959	1981	Boeing 727-200	Operated the world's first scheduled DC-8 service (from New York to Atlanta) on September 18, 1959. DC-8-11s were converted to -12s then further converted to -51s. One crashed at Flight 9877. Two hijacked as Flight 841 and Flight 821.
McDonnell Douglas DC-8-33	22	1959	1981	Boeing 727-200	Operated the world's first scheduled DC-8 service (from New York to Atlanta) on September 18, 1959. DC-8-11s were converted to -12s then further converted to -51s. One crashed at Flight 9877. Two hijacked as Flight 841 and Flight 821.
McDonnell Douglas DC-8-51	22	1959	1981	Boeing 727-200	Operated the world's first scheduled DC-8 service (from New York to Atlanta) on September 18, 1959. DC-8-11s were converted to -12s then further converted to -51s. One crashed at Flight 9877. Two hijacked as Flight 841 and Flight 821.
McDonnell Douglas DC-8-61	13	1967	1989	Boeing 757-200	
McDonnell Douglas DC-8-71	13	1967	1989	Boeing 757-200	Leased from UPS Airlines. Converted in-house to DC-8-71s in 1982-83.
Fairchild Hiller FH-227	5	1972	1974	McDonnell Douglas DC-9	Former Northeast Airlines fleet.
Lockheed L-100 Hercules	5	1966	1973	None	Retired after delivery of wide-body passenger aircraft with large under-floor cargo compartments.
Lockheed L-100 Hercules	3	1966	1973	None	Converted to L-100-20 by Lockheed. Various replacement aircraft were leased from Lockheed during the conversion program.
Lockheed L-749 Constellation	10	1953	1958	Douglas DC-7	Acquired through the purchase of Chicago & Southern Air Lines.
Lockheed L-1011 TriStar	70	1973	2001	Boeing 767	Largest L-1011 operator, including the long-range L-1011-500. One crashed as Flight 191.
McDonnell Douglas DC-9-14	17	1965	1973	Boeing 737-200	Launch customer. One crashed as Flight 9570.
McDonnell Douglas DC-9-30	77	1967	1993 (Note: Delta originally had DC-9-30s from 1967 to 1993. Delta sold some of its DC-9-30s back to McDonnell Douglas, which sold them to ValuJet, forming ValuJet's initial fleet. ValuJet would eventually become Delta's main Atlanta-based rival, AirTran Airways. However, Delta inherited a fleet of -30s in 2008 when it merged with Northwest Airlines. Two of these had been delivered to Delta in 1967.)	Boeing 737-200	One crashed as Flight 723. One hijacked as Flight 523.
McDonnell Douglas DC-9-30	27	2010	2010	Boeing 717-200; McDonnell Douglas MD-90	Former Northwest Airlines fleet. Never wore Delta livery.
McDonnell Douglas DC-9-41	12	2010	2011	Boeing 717-200; McDonnell Douglas MD-90	Former Northwest Airlines fleet. Never wore Delta livery.
McDonnell Douglas DC-9-51	34	2010	2014	Boeing 717-200; McDonnell Douglas MD-90	Former Northwest Airlines fleet. N782NC ship 9873 preserved at Northland Community & Technical College. N767NC ship 9858 preserved at Minneapolis–Saint Paul International Airport for fire training. N675MC ship 9880 preserved at Delta Flight Museum.
McDonnell Douglas DC-10-10	5	1972	1976	Lockheed L-1011 TriStar	Ordered in 1971 due to delays in the development of the Lockheed TriStar, sold to United Airlines before delivery then leased back by Delta.
McDonnell Douglas DC-10-10	9	1987	1988	Lockheed L-1011 TriStar	Former Western Airlines fleet.
McDonnell Douglas MD-11	17	1990	2004	Boeing 767; Boeing 777-200ER	
McDonnell Douglas MD-88	120	1987	2020	Airbus A220; Airbus A321-200; Boeing 737-900ER	Retirement accelerated due to the COVID-19 pandemic. One was written off as Flight 1086. One was damaged as Flight 1288.
McDonnell Douglas MD-90	65	1995	2020	Airbus A220; Airbus A321-200; Boeing 737-900ER	Retirement accelerated due to the COVID-19 pandemic. First and final MD-90 operator.
