= Delta Ship 41 =

Douglas DC-3 that flew for Delta Air Lines

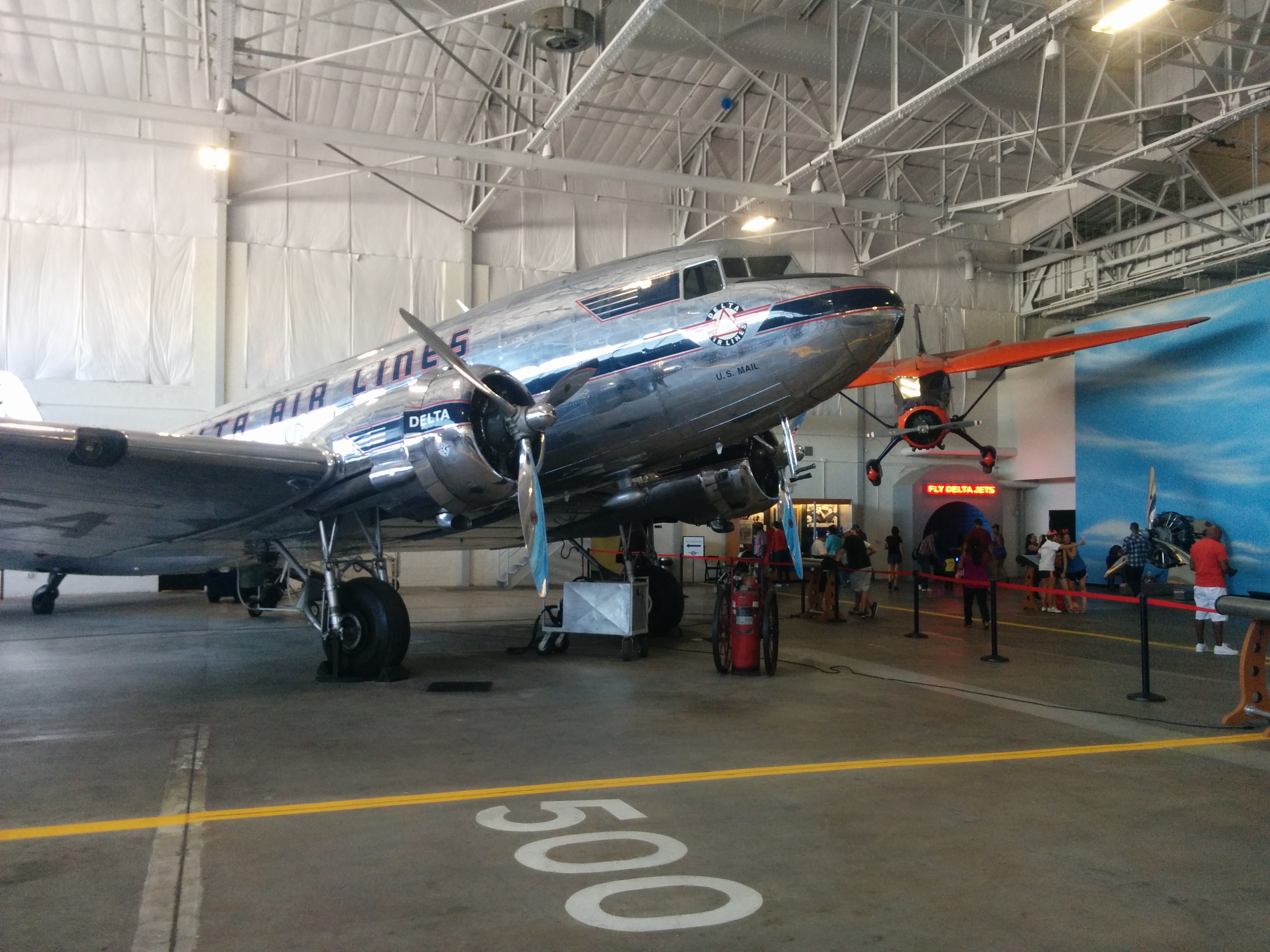
- Delta Ship 41 in Historic Hangar 1

General information
- Type: Douglas DC-3
- Construction number: 3278
- Registration: N28341

History
- Manufactured: 1940
- Preserved at: Delta Flight Museum

Delta Ship 41 is a Douglas DC-3 that flew for Delta Air Lines from 1941 to 1958.

== Operational history ==
Delta's Ship 41 was the second of Delta's first five iconic DC-3 airplanes to be delivered from Douglas Aircraft Co. between November 1940-January 1941:

- The first DC-3, Delta Ship 40, was christened "City of Atlanta" with a bottle of Coca-Cola. It went into scheduled service on December 24, 1940.
- Ship 41 went into service on January 19, 1941, flying from Atlanta to Ft. Worth, Texas. Delta Air Lines used the airplane for 17 years until 1958.

Ship 41 was acquired by another airline in Delta's family tree—North Central. North Central became part of Delta's history through its merger with Northwest Airlines in 2008.

The aircraft then flew for a number of different airlines before finally being operated by Air Puerto Rico, a Puerto Rican cargo airline company.

== Restoration ==
In 1990, a group of Delta retirees and enthusiasts located one of Delta's first five DC-3s in order to restore it to flying condition. Their investigation led them to "Ship 41", then flying as a cargo aircraft, registered N29PR for a local Puerto Rican airline, Air Puerto Rico. In 1993, Delta bought the aircraft from Air Puerto Rico and it was flown to Atlanta, where it underwent a five-year restoration and is now on display at the Delta Flight Museum.
