= Delta Flight Museum =

- Location within Metro Atlanta Location within Georgia Location within the United States
- Former name: Delta Air Transport Heritage Museum
- Established: 1995
- Location: 747 Woolman Place Atlanta, GA 30354
- Coordinates: 33.655043°N 84.420127°W
- Type: Aviation museum
- Website: www.deltamuseum.org

The Delta Flight Museum is an aviation and corporate museum located in Atlanta, Georgia, United States, near the airline's main hub, Hartsfield–Jackson Atlanta International Airport. The museum is housed in two 1940s-era Delta Air Lines aircraft hangars at Delta's headquarters, designated a Historic Aerospace Site in 2011. Its mission is to allow visitors from around the world "to explore aviation history, celebrate the story and people of Delta, and discover the future of flight." Over 40 airlines in Delta's family tree can be found in the museum's collections and exhibitions. The museum is a nonprofit organization and relies on volunteers, corporate sponsors, donations, event rentals and merchandise sales. The Delta Flight Museum is considered an ongoing project and items are added to the collections year round.

The museum opened to the general public in June 2014. Prior to that, Delta employee ID or prior arrangement was required to access the campus in which the museum is located.

== Origins ==
The idea for a museum about Delta Air Lines originated with group of retirees who started a campaign in 1990 to find one of Delta's original five purchased-new Douglas DC-3s from the early 1940s. After some searching, the employees found Delta Ship 41, Delta's second DC-3 to carry passengers, in Puerto Rico performing cargo services. The group bought the plane from the cargo airline and flew Ship 41 home to Atlanta. The aircraft restoration project combined with efforts to consolidate historic collections from around the Delta headquarters led to the formation of a non-profit museum, named the Delta Air Transport Heritage Museum, Inc.

From 1995 to October 8, 1999, Ship 41 was painstakingly restored by active and retired Delta employees and volunteers to its exact original configuration and appearance when it was first delivered to Delta on January 4, 1941. Delta Ship 41 is by far one of the most faithfully restored passenger transport DC-3s in the world, evidenced by the fact that in 2001, it was the first aircraft to be presented with an award from the National Trust for Historic Preservation. Delta Ship 41 is the only remaining Delta passenger Douglas DC-3 left in existence. Delta Air Lines is the only major air carrier known to still possess its first new passenger carrying DC-3.

On May 23, 1995, the Delta Air Transport Heritage Museum was incorporated under Georgia law as an independent nonprofit corporation, organized exclusively for public charitable uses and purposes and qualified under Section 501(c)(3) of the Internal Revenue Code.

== Historic Hangar 1 ==
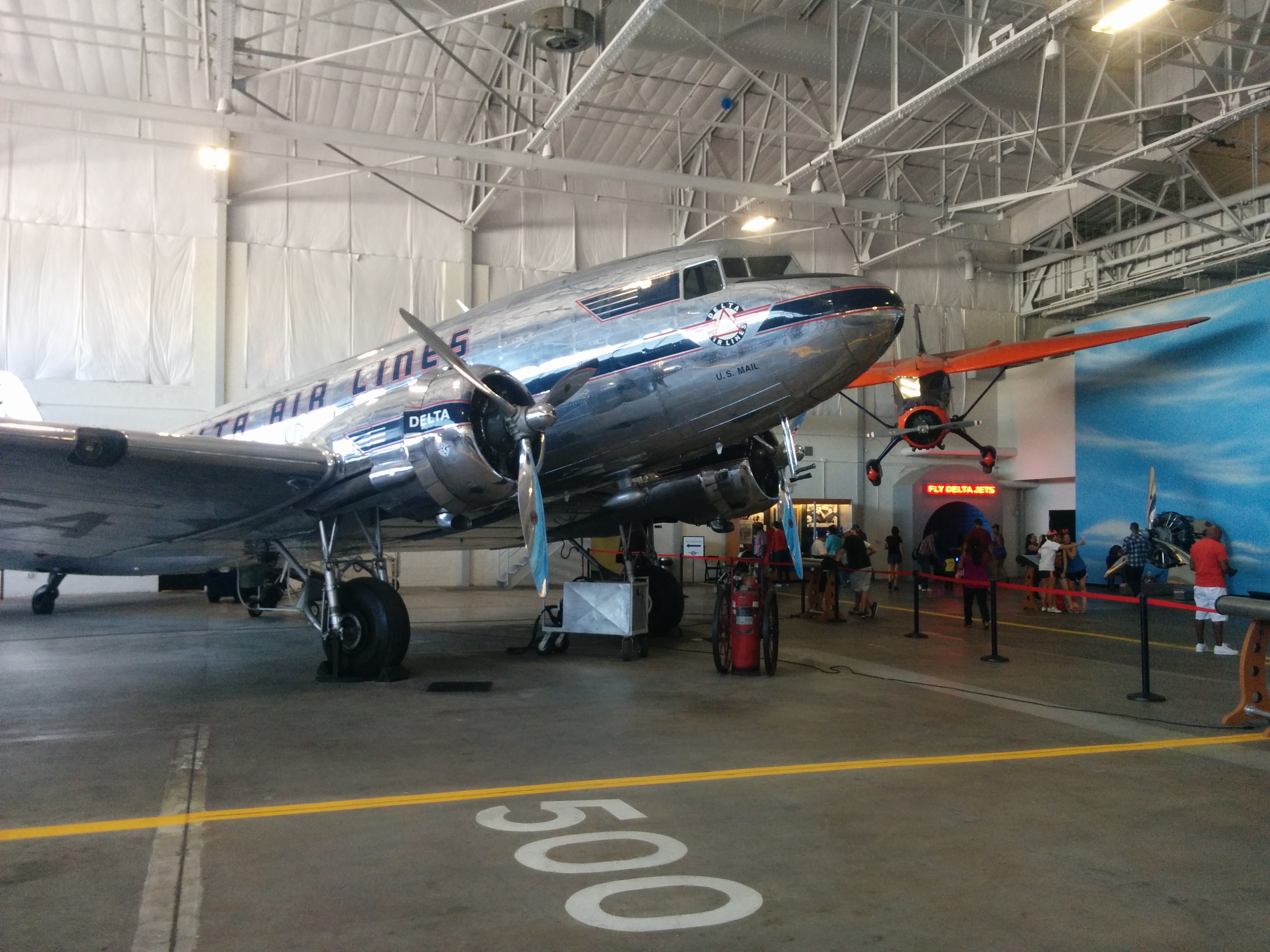
Delta Ship 41 in Historic Hangar 1, with the Stinson Reliant in the background

In the Propeller Era (Hangar One) is the Monroe Cafe, a full-scale replica of Delta's former Monroe, Louisiana headquarters. It served as Delta's headquarters from 1928 to 1941, when headquarters were moved to Atlanta. Hangar One also houses several of the museum's restored aircraft, which include:

- Delta Ship 41, one of Delta's first iconic DC-3 aircraft.
- A 1931 Travel Air 6000, symbolizing the airline's first passenger aircraft.
- A Huff-Daland Duster biplane replica, representing the first aircraft operated by Delta's predecessor.
- A 1936 Stinson Reliant SE. Nicknamed the "Gull Wing", this unique aircraft served as an instrument trainer for Northeast Airlines pilots in 1941–1942.
- Northwest Airlines Waco 125. The only aircraft of its kind remaining. Rare version of Waco 10 biplane built with Siemens-Halske SH-12 engine.

== Historic Hangar 2 ==
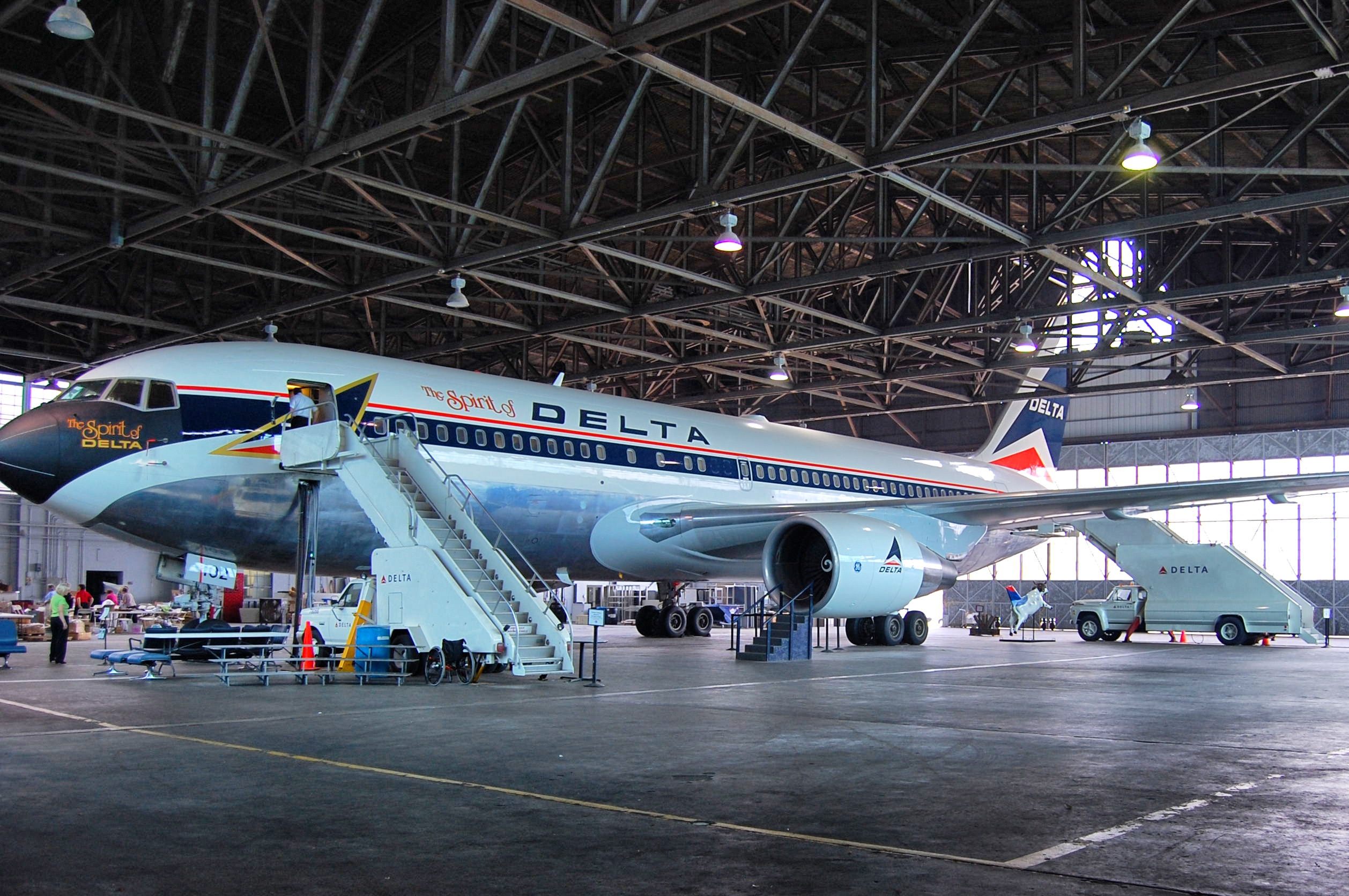
The Spirit of Delta in the restoration hangar

The Jet Era (Hangar Two) showcases Boeing 767 Delta Ship 102 (N102DA), The Spirit of Delta. Acquired in 1982, it was the company's first Boeing 767-200. It was paid for "by voluntary contributions from employees, retirees and Delta's community partners." The effort, called Project 767, was led by three Delta flight attendants to show the employees' appreciation to Delta for "solid management and strong leadership during the first years following airline deregulation." The aircraft was repainted in a commemorative paint scheme and toured the country to celebrate the airline's 75th anniversary in 2004. The airplane remained the flagship of the Delta fleet until March 2006 (it was later replaced with a Boeing 777-200LR named The Delta Spirit). The aircraft arrived at the museum on March 3, 2006, after a farewell tour around the United States. Additional exhibit items in Hangar 2 include the forward fuselage of the prototype Lockheed L-1011 (formerly home to the museum store), the cockpit section of a Convair 880, the tail section of a Douglas DC-9, and a Boeing 737 flight simulator that formerly trained Delta pilots and now available for a one-hour flight experience.

== Outdoor collection ==
The museum's collection includes three other aircraft which are parked outdoors around the edges of the museum parking lot: a Boeing 757-200 painted in the 1980s livery, registered N608DA (ship no. 608, manufactured in 1985), a McDonnell Douglas DC-9-50 registered N675MC (ship no. 9880, built in 1975), and first ever Boeing 747-400 produced for passenger transport, registered N661US (ship no. 6301).

=== Delta Ship 6301 and the 747 Experience ===
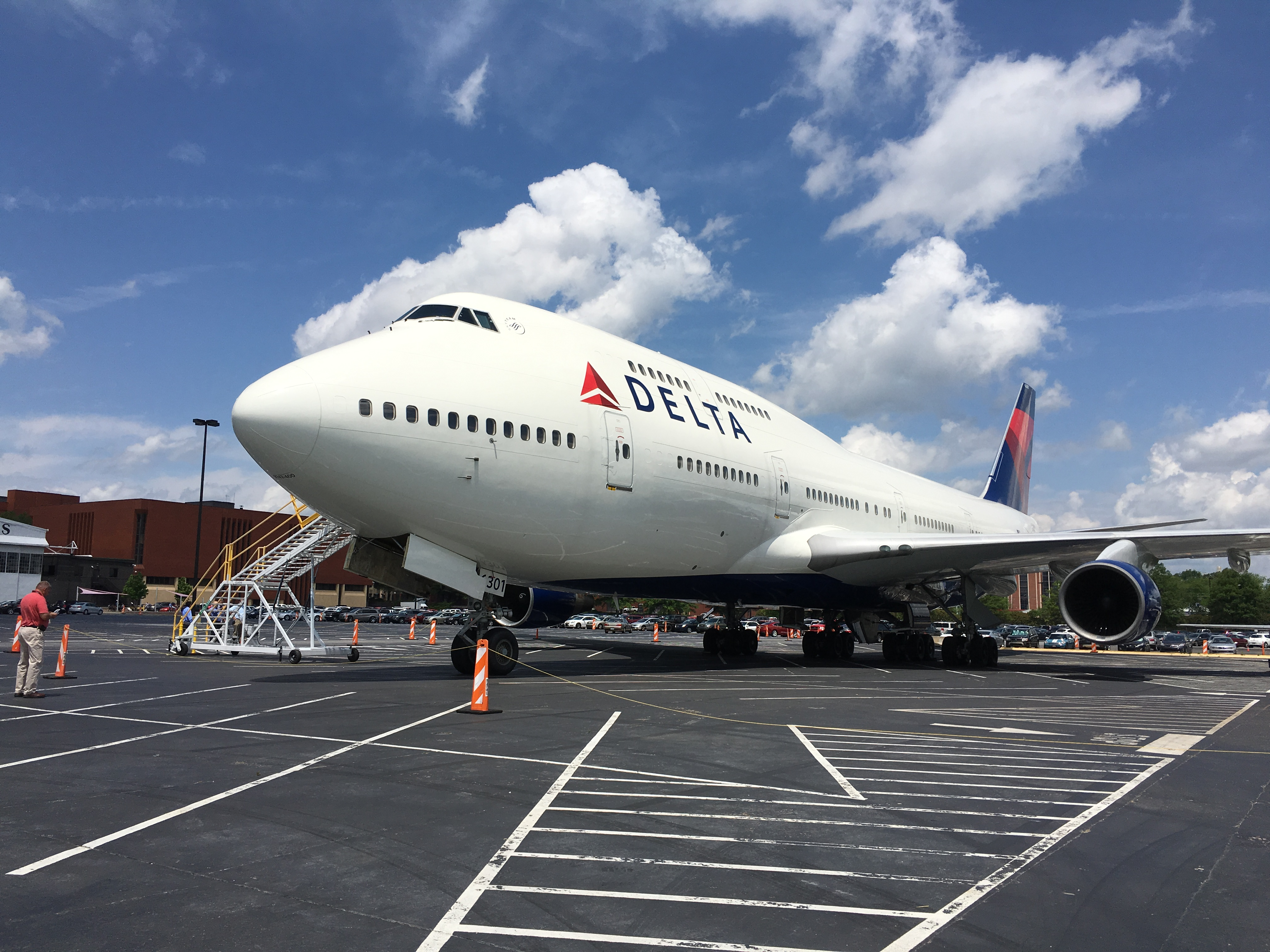
Delta Ship 6301 (N661US), the first production 747-400, at the museum. This photograph was taken prior to the construction of the 747 Experience.

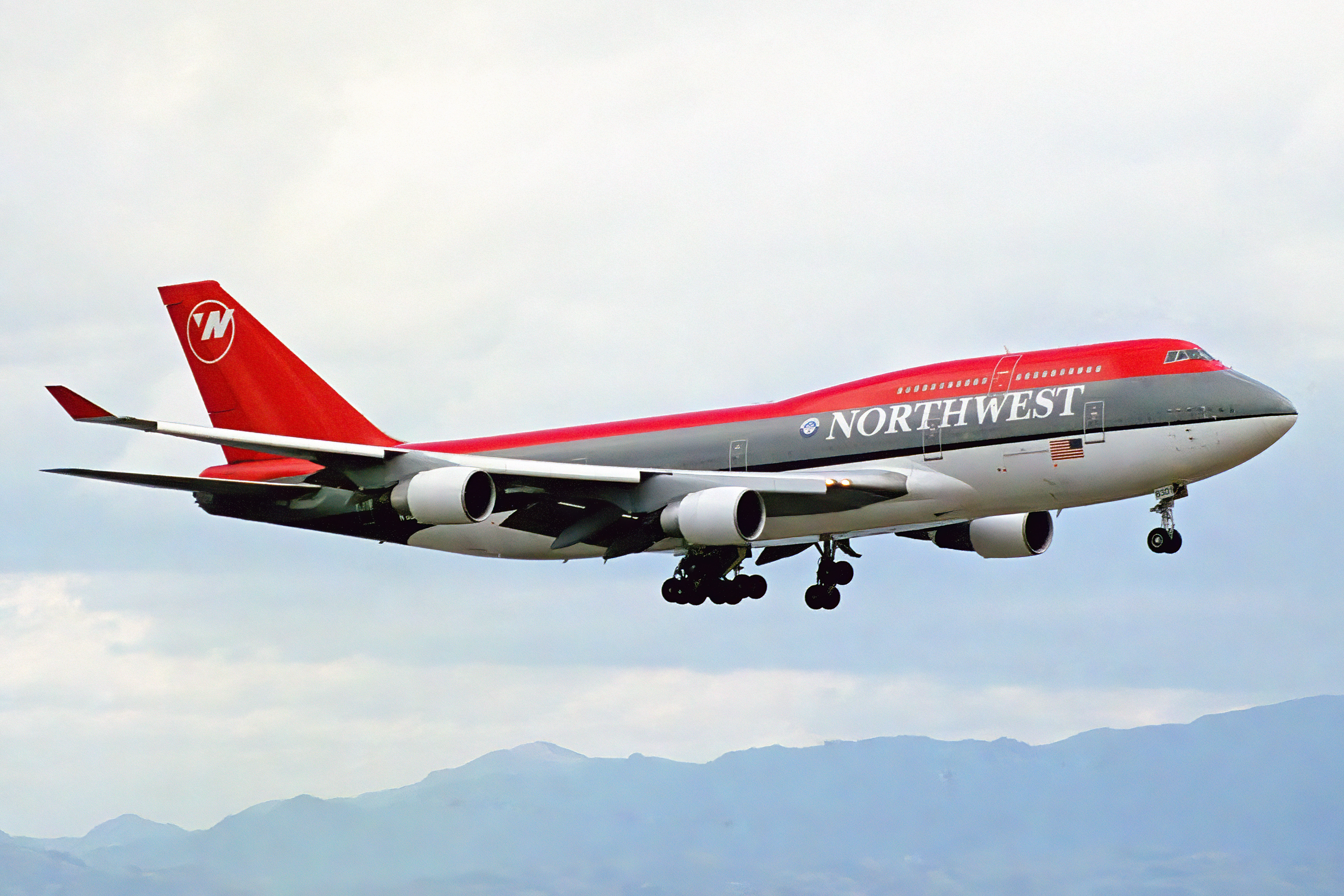
N661US when it was in service with Northwest Airlines

The most significant aircraft in the outdoor collection is Delta Ship 6301 (N661US), the first production Boeing 747-400. Originally used for flight testing by Boeing as N401PW, N661US was delivered to Northwest Airlines on December 8, 1989.

On October 9, 2002, N661US was operating as Northwest Flight 85 when it had to make an emergency landing in Anchorage while on its way to Tokyo from Detroit for a rudder malfunction.

When Northwest merged with Delta in 2009, N661US became Delta Ship 6301 and continued passenger operations for Delta until it was retired on September 9, 2015, having logged more than 61 million miles of flight over its lifetime.

The following April, the jumbo jet was moved across two streets from a parking spot on the tarmac at Atlanta Hartsfield-Jackson International Airport to its permanent home in the museum parking lot.

Delta employees conducted a funding campaign called "The Airloom Project" with the aim of converting Ship 6301 and the parking lot surrounding it into an outdoor exhibit similar to The Spirit of Delta inside. Much as in the Spirit of Delta, museum visitors enter the 747-400 via stairs and an elevator, proceed through the intact first class cabin, then through the economy section, part of which has been converted into an exhibition space, where the aft pressure bulkhead is visible. Visitors are also able to walk on a walkway that runs over part of the wing, protected by railings. In addition, the cargo hold has been emptied and the cabin ceiling removed so that visitors can look down from the upper deck through the lower deck and cargo hold to see the entirety of the aircraft's massive cross-section.

== Collections, exhibitions, and facilities ==
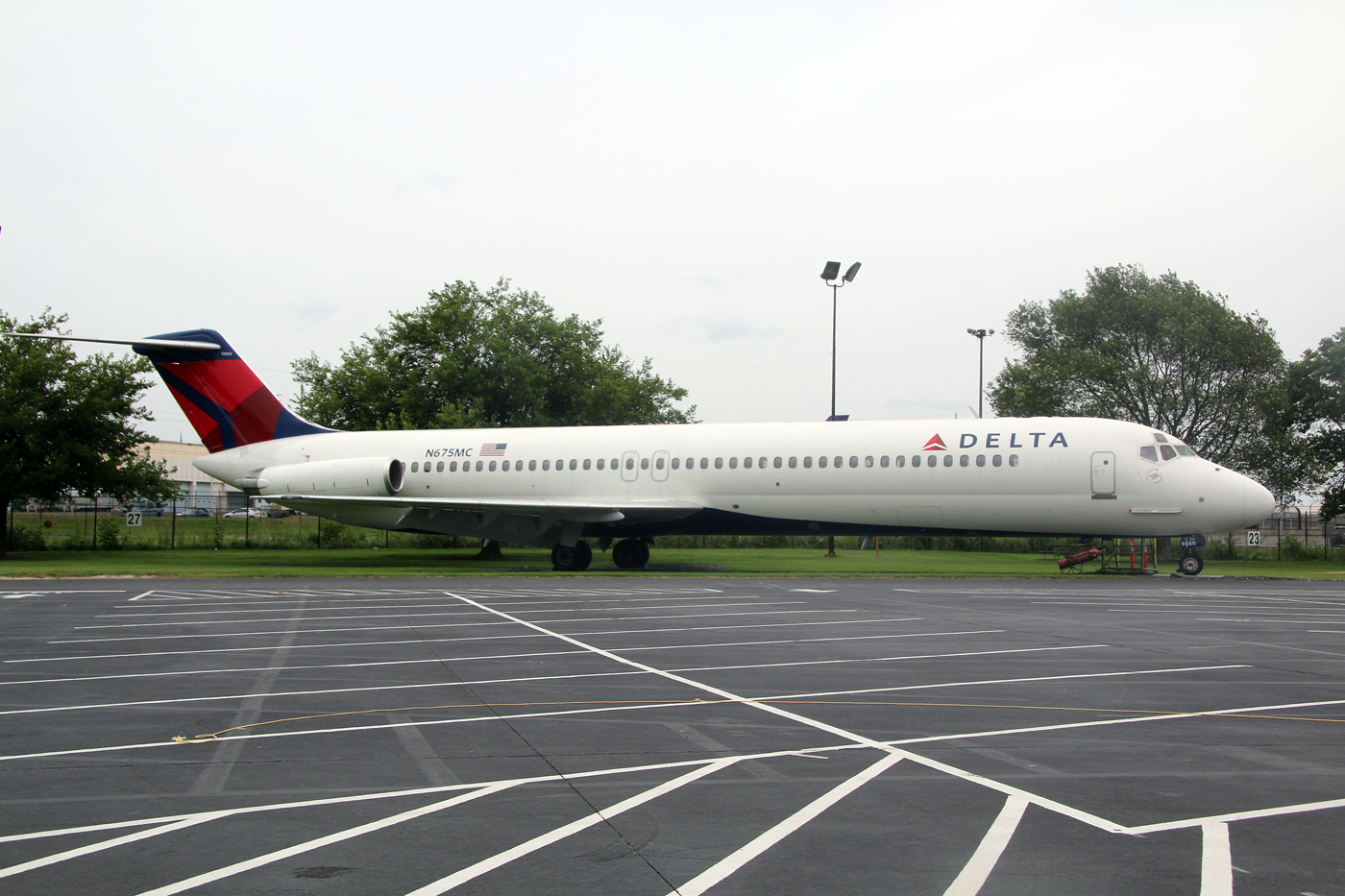
N675MC, the museum's DC-9, and longest-operating aircraft in the airline's fleet at the time of its retirement

The museum's collections and facilities include:

- The Spirit of Delta, Delta's first Boeing 767-200, which was bought by employees, retirees, and friends and was donated to Delta in 1982. The rear segment of the aircraft has been converted into exhibition space and houses two exhibitions, while the cockpit, galley, and first class section remain intact.
- "Ship 41," the first Douglas DC-3 to carry Delta passengers, which was restored by volunteers and a core mechanic team from 1993 to 1999, after being found in Puerto Rico flying for Air Puerto Rico. In 2001, Ship 41 became the first aircraft to be presented an award by the National Trust for Historic Preservation.
- A 1931 Travel Air, representing Delta's first passenger aircraft.
- A 1936 Stinson Reliant SE. Nicknamed the "Gull Wing", this unique aircraft served as an instrument trainer for Northeast Airlines pilots in 1941–1942.
- Professionally-managed archives of records and artifacts related to Delta and its related airlines.
- An aviation reference library.
- Various temporary exhibits.
- A 1975 McDonnell Douglas DC-9-50, N675MC. At the time of its retirement in 2013, it was the oldest aircraft in the Delta fleet.
- Replica of the first Delta station in Monroe, Louisiana.
- The forward fuselage of the first Lockheed L-1011 TriStar built. Delta at one time operated almost 60 of the type, although the museum's example was not among them.
- Delta Ship 6301 (N661US). Retired on September 9, 2015, after serving since December 8, 1989 with Northwest Airlines, this aircraft was the first Boeing 747-400 ever built, as well as the prototype aircraft. It was the plane that was involved in an incident in 2002, operating as Northwest Airlines Flight 85.
- A 1985 Boeing 757-200, N608DA.
- A 1957 built Douglas DC-7B (N4887C).

== See also ==
- Candler Field Museum
