= N661US =

Preserved prototype of the Boeing 747-400

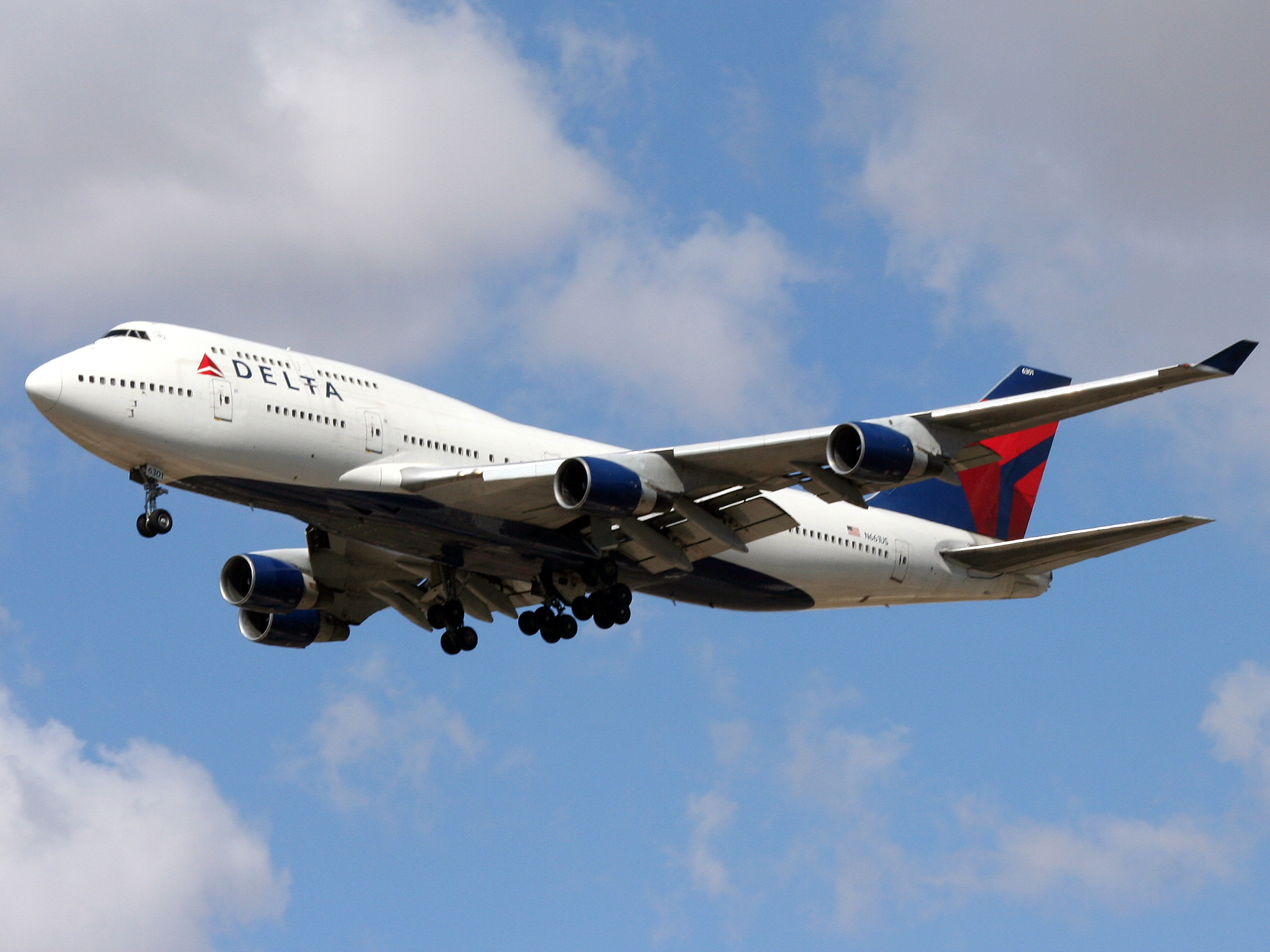
- N661US in service with Delta Air Lines in 2013

General information
- Other names: Delta Ship 6301; N401PW
- Type: Boeing 747-451 (Note: The 4 in the suffix denotes that it was a -400 series variant of the 747; 51 is the Boeing customer code for Northwest Airlines.)
- Manufacturer: Boeing
- Registration: N661US
- Total distance: 61 million miles (98 million kilometers)

History
- First flight: April 29, 1988
- In service: 1989–2015; 1989–2009: Northwest Airlines; 2009–2015: Delta Air Lines
- Last flight: September 9, 2015
- Preserved at: Delta Flight Museum in Atlanta, Georgia

N661US is an aircraft that was built by Boeing as the prototype of the Boeing 747-400, a modernized version of the Boeing 747. The plane rolled off the assembly line on January 26, 1988, and had its first flight on April 29, 1988. After the 747-400 flight testing program had concluded, Boeing delivered the aircraft to Northwest Airlines on December 8, 1989.

In 2002, the 747 was involved in an incident in which it experienced a lower rudder hardover event. This occurs when an aircraft's rudder deflects to its travel limit without crew input. The pilots were able to overcome the issue and land safely. The problem was blamed on metal fatigue, and an airworthiness directive was issued to prevent the possibility of a future accident.

The aircraft was eventually transferred to Delta Air Lines, after Delta's merger with Northwest in 2009. While in service with Delta, it was known as Delta Ship 6301. It continued in passenger service until it was retired on September 9, 2015. Later, it was transferred to the Delta Flight Museum in Atlanta, Georgia, where it remains on display.

== History ==
=== Construction and flight testing ===
This Boeing 747-451 was the first 747-400, an improved version of Boeing's successful jumbo jet. The aircraft was the 696th Boeing 747 built and carried manufacturer's serial number 23719. Final assembly began at the Boeing Everett Factory, the longtime site of 747 production, in September 1987. Assembly was completed over the winter months of late 1987, and the aircraft rolled out of the factory on January 26, 1988.

Compared to earlier 747s, the -400 series had a two-crew glass cockpit, eliminating the need for a flight engineer. It carried over the stretched upper deck first introduced for the 747-300 and offered a choice of improved turbofan engines. Boeing assigned this aircraft test registration N401PW, as it would test the Pratt & Whitney PW4056 engine option.

The aircraft flew for the first time on April 29, 1988, under the command of test pilot James Loesch and co-pilot Kenneth Higgins. The first flight was six weeks behind schedule owing to subcontractor delays in supplying components and extra troubleshooting on the aircraft's electronics systems. The maiden flight took off from Paine Field, the site of the Everett factory, and landed at Boeing Field, south of Seattle, after an uneventful 2 hours and 26 minutes. Boeing used the aircraft for several months for test flying duties until the type was certified by the Federal Aviation Administration (FAA) on January 10, 1989.

=== Commercial service ===
The aircraft was delivered to Northwest Airlines on December 8, 1989. When Northwest merged with Delta in 2009, N661US became Delta Ship 6301 and continued passenger operations for Delta until it was retired on September 9, 2015, making its final flight from Daniel K. Inouye International Airport in Honolulu to Hartsfield–Jackson Atlanta International Airport, having logged more than 61 million miles (98 million kilometers) of flight over its lifetime.

=== Northwest Airlines Flight 85 ===
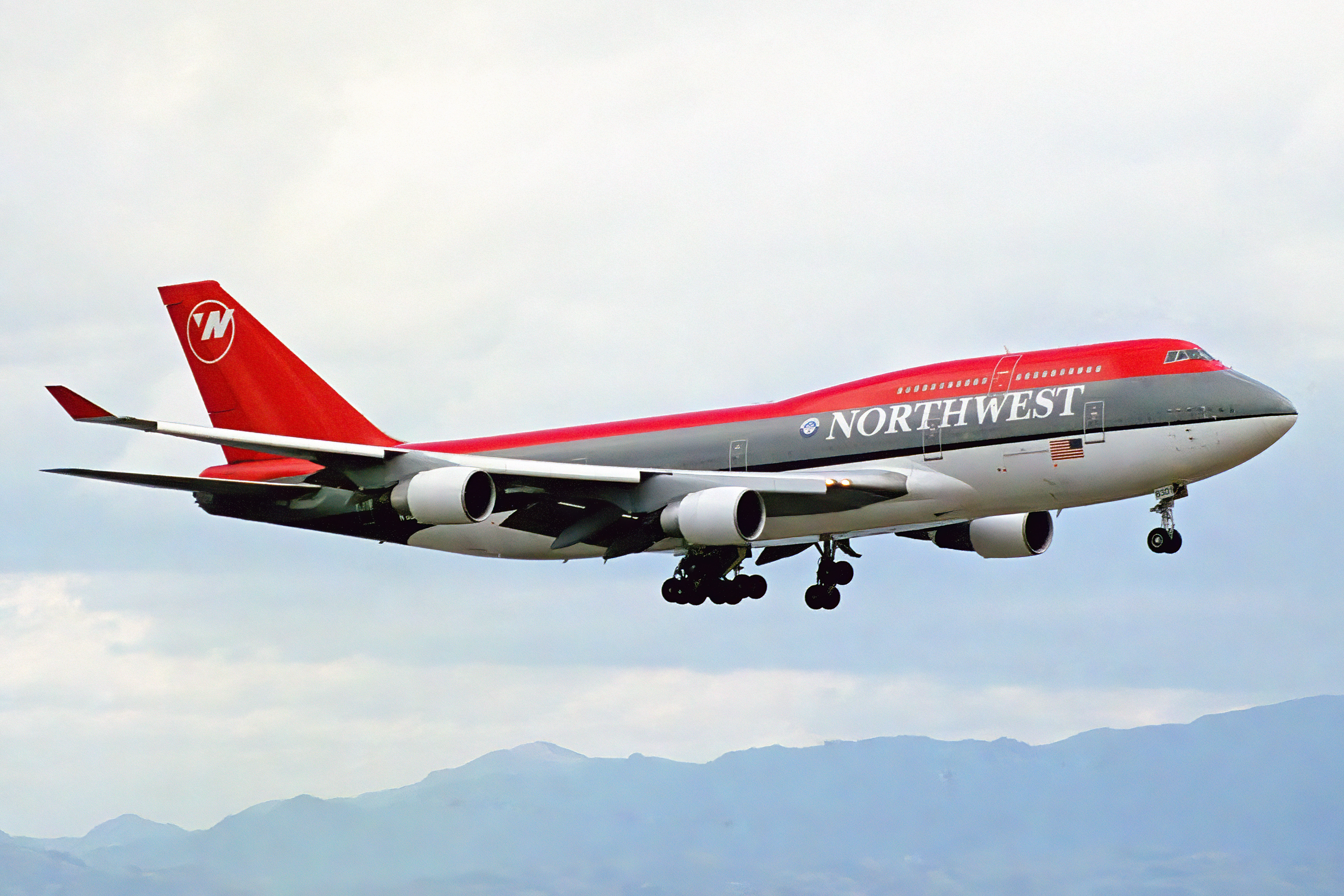
N661US when it was in service with Northwest Airlines

On October 9, 2002, N661US was involved in an incident as Northwest Airlines Flight 85. N661US was operating a scheduled international passenger flight from Detroit Metropolitan Wayne County Airport in Detroit, United States, to Narita International Airport in Tokyo, Japan. While over the Bering Sea, the aircraft experienced a lower rudder hardover event, which occurs when an aircraft's rudder deflects to its travel limit without crew input. The hardover event gave full left lower rudder, requiring the pilots to use full right upper rudder and right aileron to maintain attitude and course.

The flight diverted to Ted Stevens Anchorage International Airport, in Alaska, and made a safe landing. None of the 404 passengers or crew were injured. The subsequent National Transportation Safety Board (NTSB) investigation found that the lower rudder control module's cast metal housing had broken due to a fatigue crack, resulting in the hardover. The incident resulted in an airworthiness directive to prevent the possibility of a future accident. N661US was not damaged during the incident, and it returned to service with Northwest Airlines.

=== Preservation ===
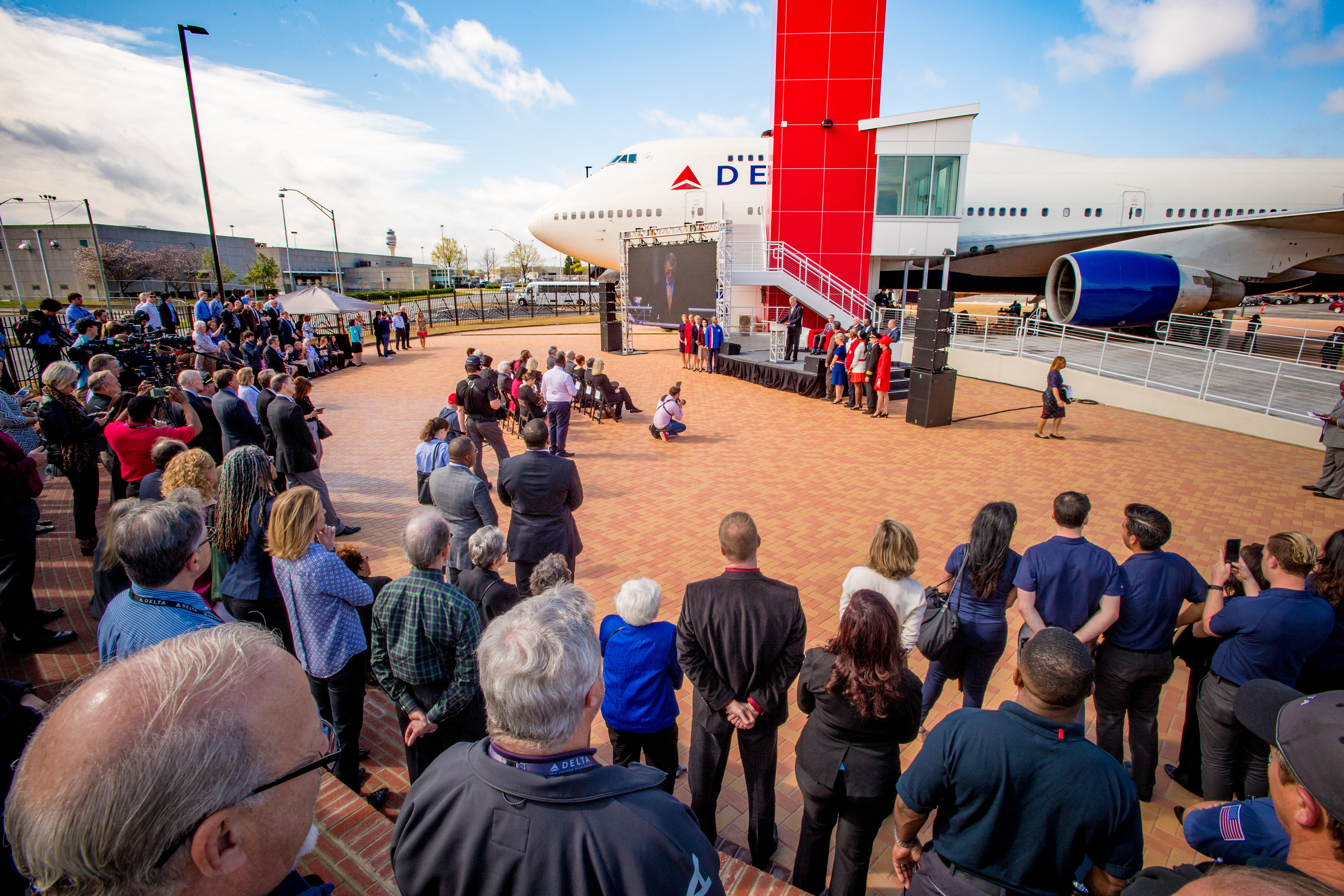
N661US on display at the Delta Flight Museum in Atlanta

After its final flight in September 2015, N661US remained parked at Atlanta while crews removed parts that could be reused on other Delta aircraft. In April 2016, the jumbo jet was moved across two streets to its permanent home in front of the Delta Flight Museum in Atlanta.

Delta employees conducted a funding campaign called "The Airloom Project" with the aim of converting Ship 6301 and the parking lot surrounding it into an outdoor exhibit. The exhibit, called "The 747 Experience", opened on March 28, 2017.

Economy Class Cabin of N661US

Business Class Cabin of N661US

Museum visitors enter the 747-400 via stairs or an elevator, proceed through the intact first-class cabin, and then through the economy section, part of which has been converted into an exhibition space, where the aft pressure bulkhead is visible. Visitors are also able to walk on a walkway that runs over part of the wing, protected by railings. In addition, the cargo hold has been emptied and the cabin ceiling removed so that visitors can look down from the upper deck through the lower deck and cargo hold to see the entirety of the aircraft's massive cross-section.
