= Northwest Airlines Flight 85 =

2002 aviation incident over the Bering Sea

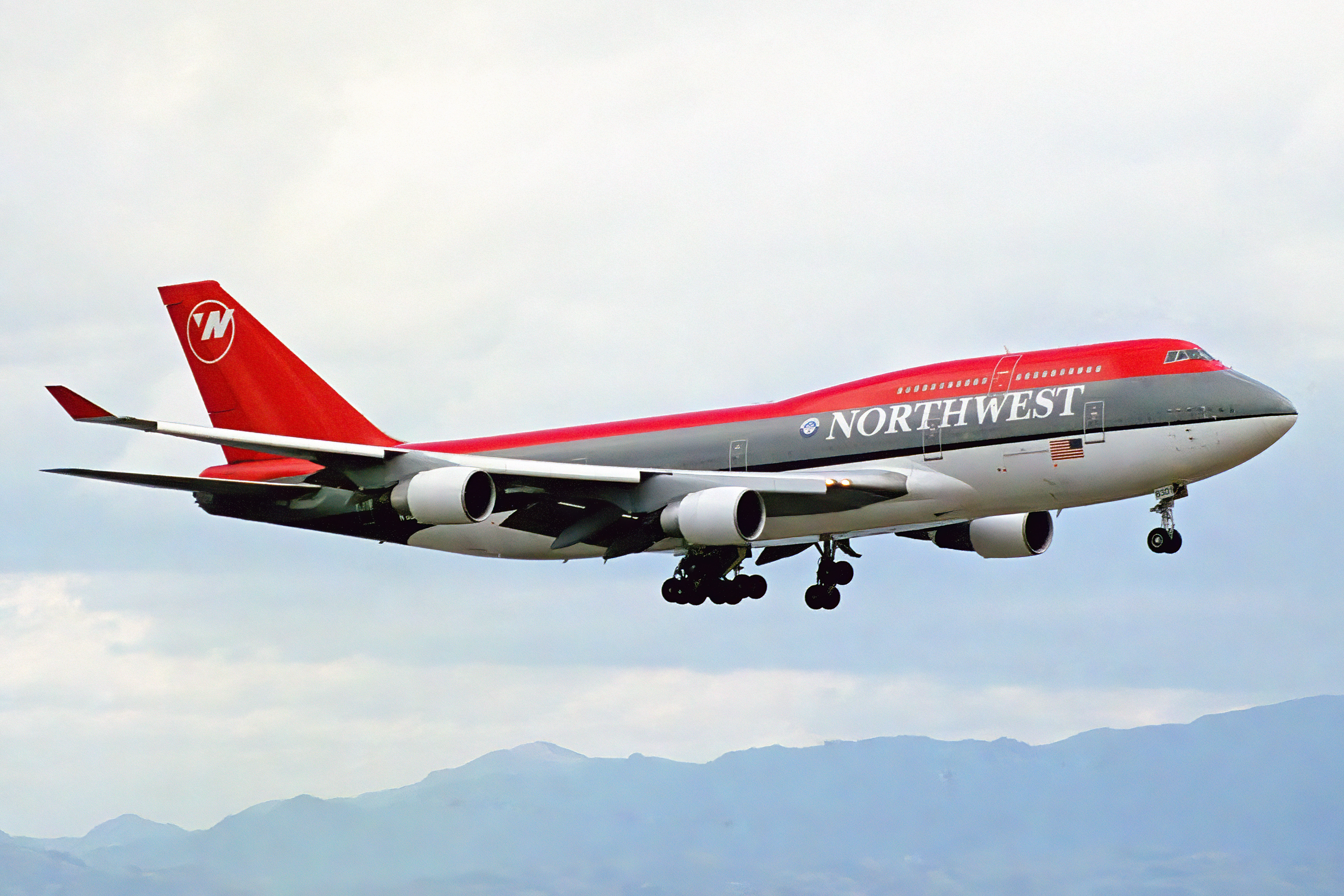
- N661US, the aircraft involved in the incident, seen in 1999

Incident
- Date: October 9, 2002
- Summary: Rudder hardover due to metal fatigue
- Site: Bering Sea

Aircraft
- Aircraft type: Boeing 747-451 (Note: The aircraft was a Boeing 747-400 model; Boeing assigns a unique code for each company that buys one of its aircraft, which is applied as a suffix to the model number at the time the aircraft is built, hence "747-451" designates a 747-400 built for Northwest Airlines (customer code 51).)
- Operator: Northwest Airlines
- IATA flight No.: NW85
- ICAO flight No.: NWA85
- Call sign: NORTHWEST 85
- Registration: N661US
- Flight origin: Detroit Metropolitan Wayne County Airport, Romulus, Michigan, United States
- Destination: Tokyo Narita Airport, Narita, Chiba, Japan
- Occupants: 404
- Passengers: 386
- Crew: 18
- Fatalities: 0
- Injuries: 0
- Survivors: 404

Northwest Airlines Flight 85 was a scheduled international passenger flight from Detroit Metropolitan Wayne County Airport in the United States to Narita International Airport in Japan. On October 9, 2002, while over the Bering Sea, the Boeing 747-400 experienced a lower rudder hardover event, which occurs when an aircraft's rudder deflects to its travel limit without crew input. The 747's hardover gave full left lower rudder, requiring the pilots to use full right upper rudder and right aileron to maintain attitude and course.

The flight diverted to Ted Stevens Anchorage International Airport. No passengers or crew were injured, but the incident resulted in an airworthiness directive to prevent the possibility of a future accident.

== Aircraft ==
The aircraft involved was the prototype Boeing 747-400 (Boeing 747-451, c/n 23719, reg N661US) and was built by Boeing, and started the flight testing program for the new model, registered as N401PW, in April 1988. It was subsequently reregistered as N661US and delivered to Northwest Airlines (the launch customer for the 747-400) on December 8, 1989. The aircraft was reregistered to Delta Air Lines on October 29, 2008, after Delta and Northwest merged. After a further seven years in service with Delta, N661US was retired in 2015, and was then sent to the Delta Flight Museum for preservation on April 30, 2016.

== Incident flight ==
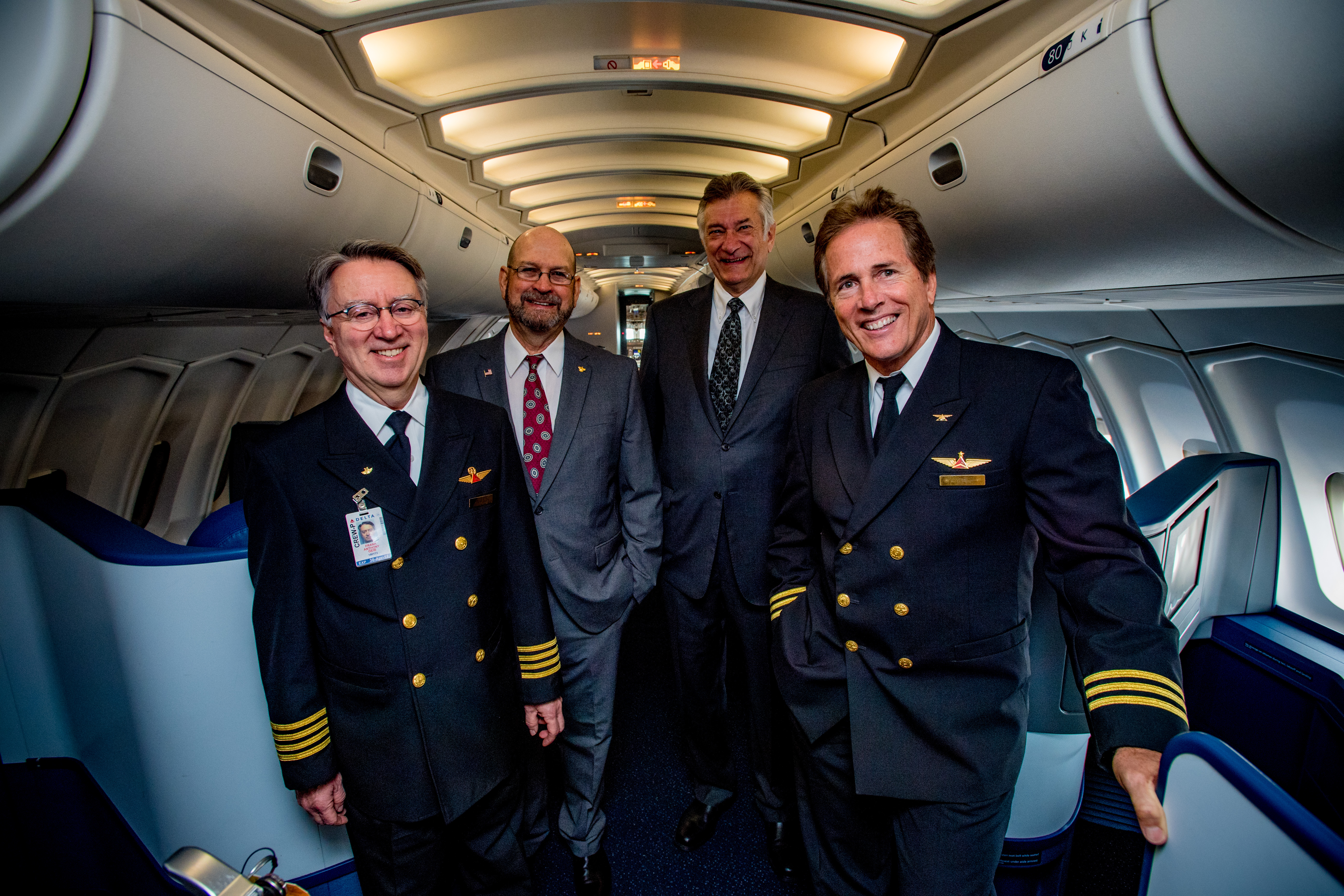
Flight 85's crew members aboard N661US following its preservation at the Delta Flight Museum. (Left to right) Frank Geib (Junior captain), Mike Fagan (Junior first officer), John Hansen (Senior captain), and David Smith (Senior first officer).

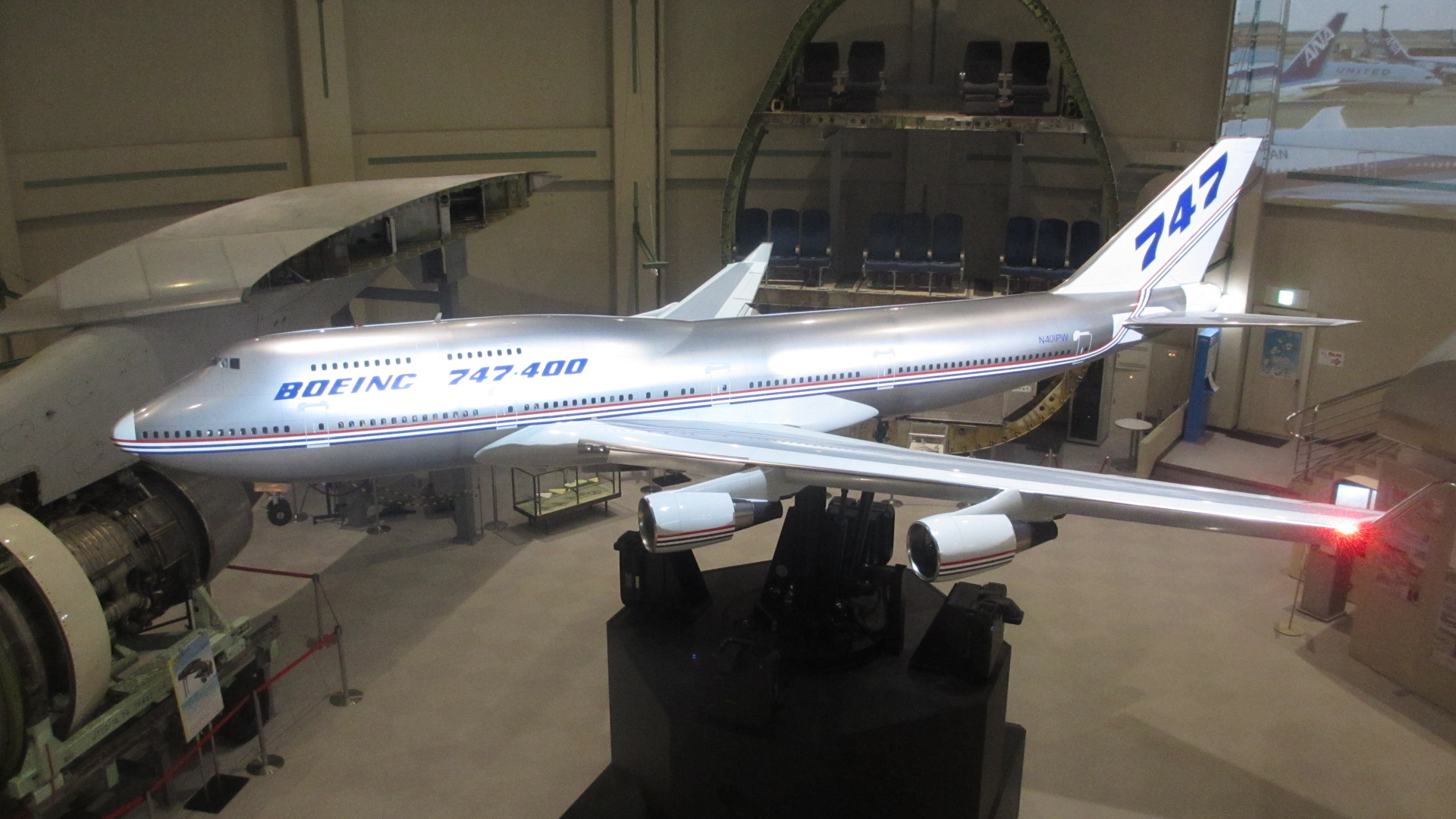
A model of N401PW at the Museum of Aeronautical Sciences at Narita Chiba.

The flight departed Detroit Metropolitan Wayne County Airport at 2:30 p.m. Eastern Daylight Time. The incident occurred at 5:40 p.m. Alaska Daylight Time, around seven hours into the flight. At the time of the incident, Junior Captain Frank Geib and First Officer Mike Fagan had just taken control of the aircraft, allowing Senior Captain John Hanson and First Officer David Smith to rest. Flight 85's captain said that the event occurred at FL350 (35,000 feet/11,000 meters).

The aircraft abruptly entered a 30- to 40-degree left bank. Geib initially believed that an engine failure had occurred. Hanson reentered the cockpit and continued to fly the aircraft by hand with Fagan. Geib declared an emergency and began a diversion to Anchorage. While the crew tried to declare the emergency, the plane was in a communications dead zone between North America and Asia. Even with a weak signal, the crew contacted another Northwest Airlines flight, Flight 19, which helped Flight 85 declare the emergency as it was closer to Alaska. Flight 85's captain reported that none of the emergency procedures available could correct the problem. The pilots established a conference call with Northwest Airlines in the Minneapolis-St. Paul area, but the employees there were unable to find a solution to the sudden bank. The flight crew took back control of the aircraft and landed at Ted Stevens Anchorage International Airport. To steer the aircraft, they had to use the ailerons and asymmetric engine thrust, applying more engine power to one side than the other.

Hanson said that crew resource management (CRM) contributed to the flight's safe landing at Anchorage:

This was a classic application of CRM. We were blessed and lucky that we had full flight crew augmentation. We had four pilots to work together in the cockpit. We had an excellent group of flight attendants on board; that became important later because we briefed this as a 'red' emergency, which means there's at least a solid chance you're going to have to evacuate. We weren't sure we were going to be able to keep the airplane on the runway.

— John Hanson, Senior Captain of Northwest Airlines Flight 85

The incident did not initially receive media attention.

== Investigation ==
The National Transportation Safety Board (NTSB) and Boeing launched investigations into the incident. NTSB investigator Carolyn Deforge, who oversaw the investigation, recounted in an interview on the television program Mayday: "It appeared to be a very dramatic event, and ... it definitively seemed like something we needed to follow up on, trying to understand what had happened."

The NTSB found that there was a fatigue crack in the power control module and that it was not possible to visually inspect that type of failure. The lower rudder control module's cast metal housing had broken. The end portion of the control module housing that housed the yaw damper actuator had separated from the main portion of the housing. Deforge said in the Mayday episode that the NW85 failure was unusual because most failures are of internal components rather than of the housing itself.

The NTSB ruled that the probable cause was a "fatigue fracture of the lower rudder power control module manifold, which resulted in a lower rudder hardover." In a rudder hardover, the rudder is driven to its full deflection and stays there.

== Legacy ==
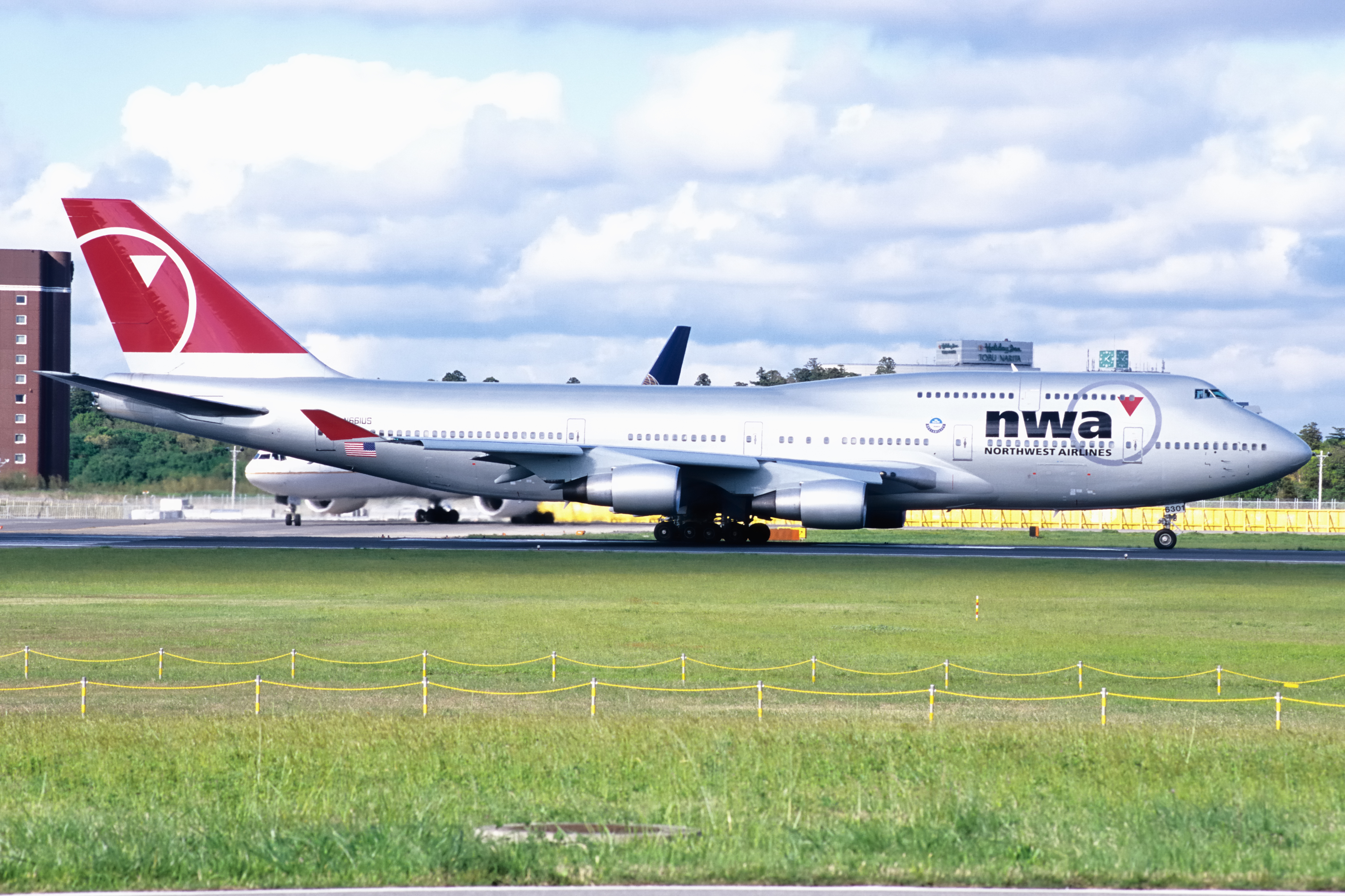
The incident aircraft, seen at Narita International Airport, while wearing its next and final Northwest Airlines livery, in 2004.

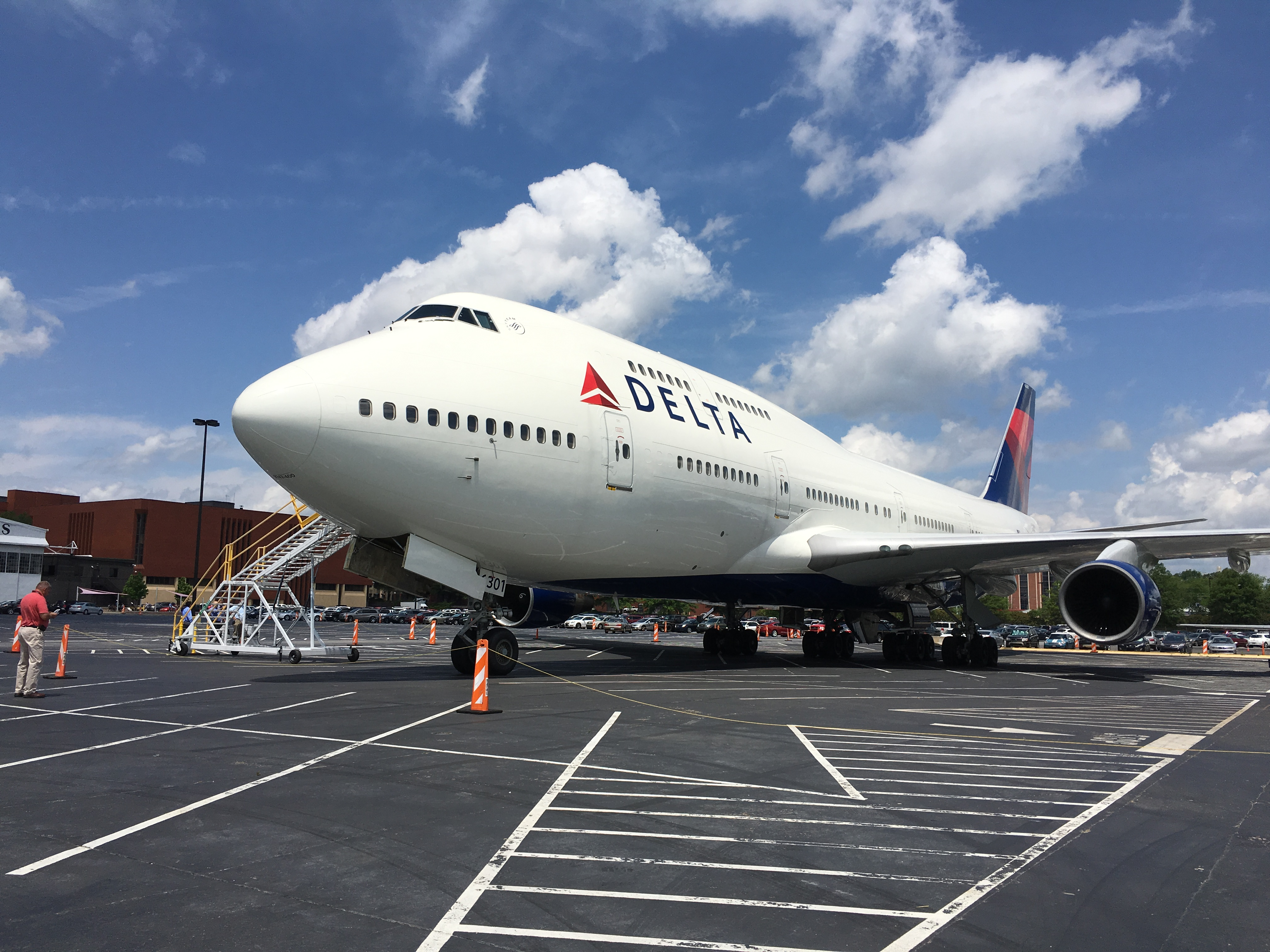
N661US's final arrival at Delta Flight Museum, Aug 20, 2016

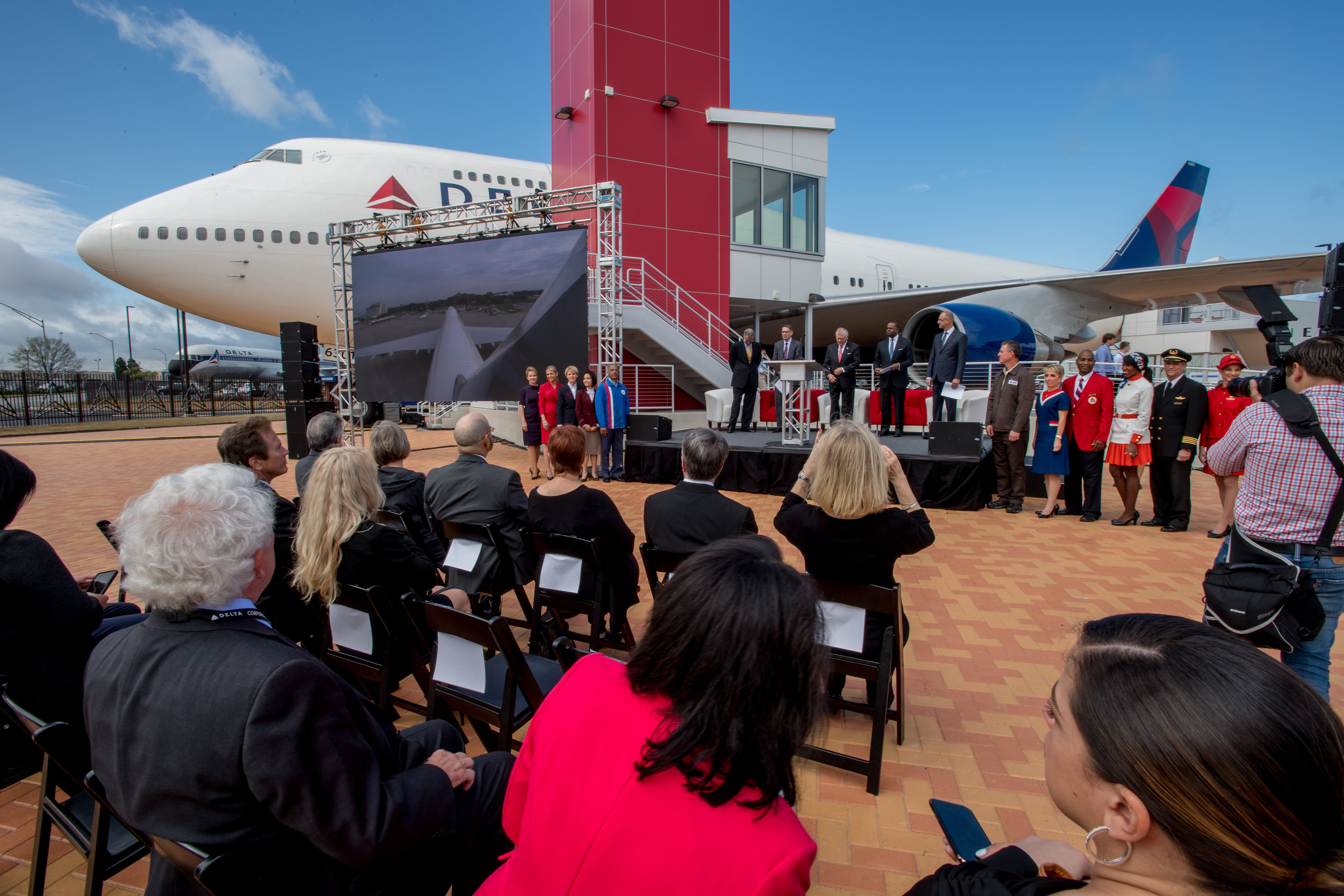
"747 Experience" Opening event at Delta Flight Museum, March 28, 2017.

=== Boeing ===
A non-destructive inspection process for the module was developed. As a result, Boeing issued Alert Service Bulletin 747-27A2397. The bulletin, dated July 24, 2003, recommended that Boeing 747 operators conduct ultrasonic inspections of pertinent high-time lower and upper rudder power control modules.

=== FAA ===
The Federal Aviation Administration published a Notice of Proposed Rule Making for an airworthiness directive that would make ultrasonic inspections mandatory on Boeing 747-400, 400D and 400F aircraft. The "Airworthiness Directive; Boeing Model 747-400, -400D, and -400F Series Airplanes" was published in the federal register on August 28, 2003. The directive, labeled Directive 2003-23-01, was issued on November 3, 2003 and became effective December 18, 2003. It has since been superseded by directive 2006-18-17, issued August 30, 2006 and effective October 13, 2006. In 2008, a proposed replacement to this directive was published.

=== Later events ===
N661US was not damaged during the incident and it was returned to service with Northwest Airlines.

By January 2004, the Air Line Pilots Association awarded the "Superior Airmanship Award" to the crew of Northwest 85.

On February 24, 2009, the aircraft involved in the incident, along with the other 747-400s in Northwest Airlines' fleet, joined the Delta Air Lines fleet as part of the Northwest-Delta Air Lines merger. On September 8, 2015, it left Honolulu, Hawaii for its final flight and was retired on arrival at Atlanta, Georgia's Hartsfield–Jackson Atlanta International Airport. It was transferred to the adjacent Delta Flight Museum for public display at the end of April 2016. After being moved to its current position, a special permanent exhibit called the 747 Experience was constructed alongside the aircraft, and was formally opened on March 28, 2017. Northwest 85 is mentioned in passing inside the 747 in question at the Delta Flight Museum.

=== Dramatization ===
The Discovery Channel Canada TV series Mayday featured the incident in a Season 11 episode titled Turning Point.

== See also ==
- Alaska Airlines Flight 261
- United Airlines Flight 585
- USAir Flight 427
- Eastwind Airlines Flight 517
- American Airlines Flight 1
