= List of Delta Air Lines accidents and incidents =

History of Delta Air Lines accidents

The following is a list of Delta Air Lines accidents and incidents.

== 1930s ==
- August 14, 1935: Delta Air Lines Flight 4, a Stinson Model A, was en route to Shreveport, Louisiana, the left engine separated from the aircraft after a propeller blade failure. The pilot attempted to make an emergency landing in a cotton field in Gilmer, Texas, but lost control and crashed killing all four on board.

== 1940s ==
- November 10, 1946: Delta Air Lines Flight 10, a Douglas DC-3 which departed Jackson, Mississippi attempting to land at then Meridian Key Field (MEI) in a thunderstorm and winds, had a runway excursion after landing, going beyond the end of the runway and up the western slope of a ditch adjoining the highway adjacent to the airport, bouncing over a highway, and coming to rest with the nose extended partially over a railroad right-of-way. All three crew and 19 passengers survived, but the aircraft was written off.
- April 22, 1947: 1947 Columbus mid-air collision, a Vultee BT-13, owned by the Tuskegee Aviation Institute, the pilot attempted to land in Columbus, Georgia and landed on top of a Delta DC-3, registration NC49657, which was flying several Delta executives from Macon to Columbus killing all eight on the DC-3 and the pilot of the Vultee BT-13.
- March 10, 1948: Delta Air Lines Flight 705, a Douglas DC-4, crashed near Chicago Municipal (Midway) Airport shortly after takeoff while en route to Miami killing 12 of 13 on board. Officials determined that longitudinal control of the airplane was lost resulting in the crash. The cause for the loss of control remains undetermined.

== 1950s ==
- May 17, 1953: Delta Air Lines Flight 318, a Douglas DC-3, crashed 13 miles (21 km) east of Marshall, Texas. The flight, which originated from Dallas Love Field, was on approach to Shreveport, Louisiana. 19 out of 20 on board perished. The crash was attributed to adverse weather conditions with a thunderstorm in the area.

== 1960s ==
- May 23, 1960: Delta Air Lines Flight 1903, a Convair 880, from Atlanta Airport, crashed during a training exercise in Atlanta. The aircraft stalled and crashed killing all four crew members.
- January 13, 1963: A Delta Air Lines Douglas DC-7, registration N4875C, crashed into a parked USAF Fairchild C-123 Provider on an unfamiliar taxiway at night. At the time the DC-7 was carrying five occupants on board during a ferrying/positioning flight and was taxiing for takeoff at then Memphis Municipal Airport when it struck the USAF airplane. The pilot of the DC-7 was killed and the C-123 Provider was damaged by fire. The DC-7 was repaired and placed back into service.
- March 30, 1967: Delta Air Lines Flight 9877, a Douglas DC-8, crashed during a training exercise near New Orleans. The improper use of flight and power controls by both instructor and the Captain-trainee during a simulated two-engine out landing approach resulted in the loss of control. The aircraft crashed into a residential area, destroying several homes and a motel complex and killing all six crew members and 13 people on the ground.
- February 21, 1968: Delta Air Lines Flight 843, a DC-8 was hijacked to Havana, Cuba. This was the first successful hijacking to Cuba from the U.S. since 1961, and was the start of multiple hijacking attempts to Cuba in the late 1960s. This coincided with the introduction of passenger screening using metal detectors in U.S. airports starting in the late 1960s.

== 1970s ==
- September 8, 1970: Delta Air Lines Flight 439, a McDonnell Douglas DC-9 inbound from Chicago O'Hare International Airport attempting an instrument landing at night at Muhammad Ali International Airport (then Louisville-Standiford Field), landed 156 feet short of the runway threshold, hitting sloping terrain, becoming airborne, bouncing, and then skidding down the runway for nearly 1,500 yards before coming to a stop. All five crew and 89 passengers survived. The aircraft was substantially damaged, but was repaired and later placed back into service.
- May 30, 1972: Delta Air Lines Flight 9570, a McDonnell Douglas DC-9, crashed during a training exercise while attempting to land at Greater Southwest International Airport. The probable cause of the accident was wake turbulence resulting from a preceding American Airlines DC-10 which performed touch-and-go landing. The right wing hit the ground causing a fire resulting in the aircraft being written off. All four crew members were killed.
- July 31, 1972: Delta Air Lines Flight 841, a flight from Detroit to Miami, was hijacked to Algiers, Algeria by eight hijackers. The DC-8 aircraft stopped in Boston to pick up an international navigator. The flight was allowed to return with passengers to the U.S., stopping in Barcelona for refueling.
- December 20, 1972: Delta Air Lines Flight 954 a Convair 880, was at O'Hare International Airport taxiing across runway 27L in heavy fog. At the same time, North Central Airlines Flight 575, a DC-9-31, took off from the same runway. The aircraft collided killing 10 on board the DC-9, injuring 17 others, while 101 remained uninjured.
- July 31, 1973: Delta Air Lines Flight 723, operating as a DC-9, was on its scheduled flight from Burlington International Airport to Logan International Airport with a stopover at Manchester, the plane had been vectored to intercept runway 4R, however the air traffic controllers were busy handling a potential collision. When the crew of Flight 723 asked the ATC about acquiring landing clearance, the plane had descended too low below the glide slope and over the outer marker. The crew failed to stabilize the approach, resulting in the plane to crash into the airport seawall embankment. The accident killed 88 passengers and crew. One man survived and sustained serious injuries, but died over four months later of his injuries in hospital.
- November 27, 1973: Delta Air Lines Flight 516, a DC-9, crashed into approach lights during a thunderstorm at Chattanooga Metropolitan Airport, injuring 75 passengers and severely injuring 4.
- February 22, 1974: Delta Air Lines Flight 523, operating a DC-9, was hijacked when Samuel Byck, an unemployed tire salesman from Pennsylvania, shot and killed an Aviation Police Officer, then stormed aboard the Delta Air Lines flight, at Baltimore Friendship Airport (now Baltimore–Washington International Airport) scheduled to fly to Atlanta, and shot both pilots, killing the First Officer, Fred Jones. Byck's intention was to crash the plane into the White House. After shooting the pilots, the hijacker grabbed a passenger and demanded that she fly the aircraft. The passengers meanwhile fled the aircraft. The hijacking attempt ended when, after a standoff with police, Byck was shot twice through an aircraft porthole by a Maryland policeman, severely wounding him. Before police stormed the plane, Byck killed himself. The plane never left the gate during this incident.
- April 12, 1977: Delta Air Lines Flight 1080, a Lockheed L-1011 TriStar, was mid-flight on the San Diego to Los Angeles leg en route to Atlanta. The left elevator of the L-1011 stuck in the upwards position, causing the plane to pitch upward, and nearly put the plane into a stall. The crew was able to counteract the pitch by reducing the thrust on the wing engines, allowing the plane to land safely. Later investigation showed that the pressurisation cycle of the plane caused water to push inside the bearing and corroded it, which caused the elevator to stick.
- June 11, 1979: Delta Air Lines Flight 1061, a L-1011, was hijacked while operating its flight between New York's LaGuardia Airport and Fort Lauderdale. The flight landed safely in Cuba.

== 1980s ==
- August 23, 1980, a Delta Air Lines L-1011 on a San Juan to Los Angeles flight, was hijacked and flown to Cuba. The hijacker was jailed by Cuban authorities, and all passengers were released unharmed.
- September 13, 1980: a Delta Air Lines Flight from New Orleans to Atlanta, was taken over by two hijackers and forced to fly to Cuba. The flight continued to Atlanta after stopping in Havana. The hijackers were imprisoned by Cuban authorities. One hijacker was released and later sought US residency. The suspect was later arrested by US authorities in 2002 and sentenced to 10 years in prison the following year.
- July 17, 1983: Delta Air Lines Flight 722, a Boeing 727, was hijacked while operating its flight between Miami and Tampa. The flight landed safely in Cuba.
- August 18, 1983: Delta Air Lines Flight 784, a Boeing 727, was hijacked while operating its flight between Miami and Tampa. The flight landed safely in Cuba.
- March 28, 1984: Delta Air Lines Flight 357, a Boeing 727, was hijacked while operating its flight between New Orleans and Dallas. The flight landed safely in Cuba.
- August 2, 1985: Delta Air Lines Flight 191, operating a Lockheed L-1011 TriStar, on a Fort Lauderdale–Dallas/Fort Worth-Los Angeles route, suffered a severe microburst-induced wind shear which caused the plane to crash. 134 out of 163 on board were killed (2 survivors died more than 30 days after the accident) and one person on the ground in his car was killed as the plane crossed a highway while crashing. The crash would later become the subject of a television movie. Numerous changes to pilot wind shear training, weather forecasting, and wind shear detection occurred as a result of the crash.
- August 31, 1988: Delta Air Lines Flight 1141, a Boeing 727, crashed shortly after takeoff from Dallas Fort Worth International Airport bound for Salt Lake City, Utah. The investigation stated the probable cause of this accident to be improper configuration of the flaps and leading-edge slats. Fourteen died (12 passengers, two crew) out of 108 on board.
- October 14, 1989: Delta Air Lines Flight 1554, operating a Boeing 727-232, was parked at Salt Lake City International Airport preparing for a flight to Edmonton International Airport when it caught fire due to a faulty oxygen system that was never repaired correctly. Smoke quickly filled the cabin and all 19 passengers and crew were evacuated. There were three minor injuries which occurred from the evacuation. The aircraft was destroyed by the impending fire.

== 1990s ==
- January 7, 1992: Delta Air Lines Flight 1581, operating a Boeing 737, was taking off from Dallas Fort Worth International Airport, when the right engine separated due to metal fatigue and poor maintenance. The aircraft was able to return to Dallas.
- July 6, 1996: Delta Air Lines Flight 1288, operating a McDonnell Douglas MD-88, suffered an uncontained engine failure of the port (left) engine on the aircraft resulted in a fan hub piercing the cabin. The flight was scheduled to fly to Atlanta. Two passengers were killed. The aircraft involved in this accident, N927DA, was repaired and returned to service. The aircraft was retired on August 10, 2018.
- October 19, 1996: Delta Air Lines Flight 554, operating a McDonnell Douglas MD-88, crashed while landing at LaGuardia Airport in New York City. The aircraft struck the runway approach lights and then the runway edge, shearing off the main landing gear. The aircraft, N914DL, was repaired and returned to service.

== 2000s ==
- September 11, 2001: Delta Air Lines Flight 1989 was a suspected hijacked aircraft during the 9/11 attacks, Air traffic control thought they had heard “Mayday! Get out of here!” coming from Delta 1989, the plane was diverted to Cleveland where it landed without any injuries or deaths.
- March 31, 2002: Delta Air Lines Flight 12, a, McDonnell Douglas MD-11, experienced a fire warning in the number 2 (center) engine and diverted to Charlotte Douglas International Airport where an emergency evacuation was initiated. However, the warning was revealed to be erroneous, having been caused by a failure of the detection control unit.
- August 27, 2006: Comair Flight 5191, marketed to passengers as Delta Connection 5191, was in a fatal crash involving a Delta Air Lines-owned regional carrier. An attempted takeoff from Blue Grass Airport in Fayette County, Kentucky resulted in a crash that killed 47 passengers and three crew members.
- November 2008: The airline temporarily cancelled its flights to Mumbai Airport due to passenger and crew safety during the terrorist attacks in Mumbai led by 10 Pakistan based Lashkar-e-Taiba terrorists. Delta resumed its flights once the attacks ended after the last attacker was killed by security forces.
- December 25, 2009: The attempted bombing of Northwest Airlines Flight 253 occurred six days before the operating certificates of Northwest Airlines and Delta Air Lines were combined (December 31, 2009). The aircraft involved in the incident was in Delta livery and reported in some early news reports as "Delta Flight 253".

== 2010s ==
- March 5, 2015: Delta Air Lines Flight 1086, operating an MD-88, crashed while landing in heavy snowfall at LaGuardia Airport. The aircraft lost grip and departed the left side of runway 13 while traveling approximately 100 mph (87 kn; 160 km/h), coming to rest nearly perpendicular to the runway with its nose on an embankment beside the waters of Flushing Bay. The accident resulted in damage to the aircraft's nose landing gear wheel well, main electronics bay, nose section, radome/weather radar, undercarriage damage forward of the front doors, and the left wing which proceeded to leak fuel from the associated wing tank. The NTSB determined the probable cause of the accident was the captain's inability to maintain directional control of the aircraft due to his application of excessive reverse thrust, which degraded the effectiveness of the rudder in controlling the aircraft's heading. Other factors contributing to the incident was the captain's stress and high workload during landing which prevented him from immediately recognizing the use of excessive reverse thrust. There were 29 minor injuries, but no fatalities.
- June 17, 2015: Delta Air Lines Flight 159, a Boeing 747-400 registered N664US, from Detroit to Seoul-Incheon, flew through a severe hailstorm and turbulence over the Chinese Airspace, causing severe interior damage and to the nose cone, engines, and wing leading edges. Despite the damage, the flight continued towards Seoul and had an uneventful landing. Due to the severe damage, the 26 year old aircraft was written off. Temporary repairs were made to ferry the plane back to Pinal Airpark, where it was stored.

== 2020s ==
- January 14, 2020: Delta Air Lines Flight 89, a Boeing 777-200ER, was on its scheduled flight from Los Angeles International Airport to Shanghai Pudong International Airport. After taking off, the crew reported a compressor stall on the number two (right) engine. The air traffic controllers asked the crew if they could maintain their altitude and asked if pilots wanted to perform a fuel dump while above the Pacific Ocean, however the crew declined the option and decided to make a return to Los Angeles. While on approach to the airport, the plane began fuel dumping over a five-mile portion of Los Angeles, including five elementary schools and a high school. The plane landed safely after completing the fuel dump.
- June 23, 2023: Delta Air Lines Flight 1111, operating with an Airbus A319, was taxiing to the gate after landing at San Antonio International Airport, when an airport ramp worker employed by Unifi was ingested into the right engine of the aircraft and subsequently killed. The incident was ruled a suicide. There were no other injuries reported.
- January 1, 2024: Delta Air Lines Flight 2348, operating an Airbus A220-100 out of Salt Lake City International Airport, was being de-iced in preparation to depart to San Francisco International Airport, when a passenger (ticketed for a different flight to Denver International Airport) exited the terminal and entered the airport grounds unauthorized. The passenger, who was later reported as having bipolar disorder and was in a manic state, was killed as he climbed into the aircraft's engine as it was spooling down but still spinning.
- August 27, 2024: A Delta Air Lines Boeing 757-200 was undergoing maintenance when a tire explosion killed a Delta Air Lines employee and a contractor, and injured another Delta Air Lines employee in a maintenance facility at Hartsfield–Jackson Atlanta International Airport in Atlanta, Georgia.
- February 17, 2025: Delta Connection Flight 4819, operated by a Bombardier CRJ900 with the registration N932XJ, crashed while landing at Toronto Pearson International Airport, causing it to flip over on the runway. There were 21 injuries reported. All 80 passengers and crew survived the incident.
- July 30, 2025: Delta Air Lines Flight 56, an Airbus A330-900 traveling from Salt Lake City International Airport to Amsterdam Airport Schiphol, encountered severe turbulence while cruising over Wyoming, injuring several occupants. The aircraft was diverted to Minneapolis–Saint Paul International Airport, where 25 passengers were transported to local hospitals.
- March 29, 2026: Delta Air Lines Flight 104, an Airbus A330-300 registered N813NW, departing from Sao Paulo/Guarulhos International Airport, Brazil, had an engine failure and engine explosion right after take off with a fire on the engine that could be seen from the ground, leaving a trail of smoke and a grass fire along the airport runway. The aircraft returned safely after being airborne for 10 minutes.
