= 2024 Delta Air Lines disruption =

2024 flight operations disruption

- Date: July 19–25, 2024
- Location: United States
- Type: Flight cancellations
- Cause: Computer system failure due to corrupted systems following 2024 CrowdStrike-related IT outages
- Perpetrator: Delta Air Lines
- Outcome: Over 7,000 Delta flights cancelled affecting plans of 1.3 million passengers

In July 2024, Delta Air Lines, a major U.S. carrier and one of the largest airlines in the world, experienced an operational disruption following the 2024 CrowdStrike outages including the cancelation of over 1,200 flights. The incident began on the morning of Friday, July 19 when a ground stop was issued by major carriers. While other carriers quickly recovered, the crisis continued for Delta until it was able to resume normal flight operations on July 25. Delta confirmed that the crisis resulted in the cancellation of over 7,000 flights over the five days of the disruption and affected over 1.3 million passengers.

The U.S. Department of Transportation (DOT) opened an investigation into Delta Air Lines' response to the outage. The department later classified the flight delays and cancellations resulting from the July 19, 2024, incident as a "controllable" event, placing responsibility for the disruptions on the airline.

== Timeline ==
=== Day of the incident (July 19) ===
On July 19, cybersecurity company CrowdStrike distributed a faulty update to its Falcon Sensor security software that caused widespread problems with Microsoft Windows computers running the software. As a result, roughly 8.5 million systems crashed and were unable to properly restart in what has been called the largest outage in the history of information technology and "historic in scale" by the New York Times. The crash resulted in flight disruption globally with 5,078 flights, 4.6% of those scheduled that day, cancelled. An unrelated Microsoft Azure outage, affecting services such as Microsoft 365, compounded airlines' problems. However, while other airlines quickly recovered operations, Delta Air Lines did not. More than 8 million Windows-based computers were affected globally. In addition to airlines, the outage disrupted railways, hospitals, emergency services, government offices, banks, hotels, media organizations, and retailers, impacting millions of people around the world.

In the mid-morning of July 19, a ground stop was issued by the three major U.S. carriers (United, Delta, and American Airlines) that halted takeoffs but allowed aircraft already in the air to reach their destinations. Other international carriers were also affected. Around 10:30 a.m. Eastern time, the Associated Press reported that about 1,500 flights had already been cancelled in the United States due to the outage. While American Airlines, United, and other carriers internationally recovered relatively quickly after Friday, Delta, by far the hardest hit of the US major airlines, experienced an operational disruption that continued for multiple days past the incident.

Over 1,200 Delta Air Lines flights were canceled on July 19. Thousands of stranded travelers were forced to stay overnight at Hartsfield–Jackson Atlanta International Airport, Delta's largest hub and the busiest airport in the world by passenger traffic. Metro Atlanta hotels and rental car companies were overwhelmed by the crisis, leaving travelers no option but to sleep in the airport. One traveler attempting to return home to Tampa (after giving up on reaching California) reported that Amtrak was charging $1,000 for a one-way train ticket from Atlanta to Tampa. Visibly distraught passengers with nowhere to go were seen trying to sleep in the airport on hard linoleum floors without blankets or food. The airport's custodial staff were also overwhelmed, with restrooms and trash reportedly "out of control".

Around Friday, Delta banned unaccompanied minors on its flights. The New York Times reported that in some cases, children were stuck separated across state lines or even in different countries. The suspension, initially planned until Sunday, was later extended through the end of July 23. Some families stated that they were not notified of the change until children were turned away from flights.

=== Ongoing crisis (July 21–23) ===
With so many passengers still stuck in Hartsfield–Jackson after two consecutive nights, the airport implemented a "concessions crisis plan" and a plan to reunite passengers with their checked baggage. However, passengers in Atlanta continued to report "jam-packed" conditions and "heartbreaking" scenes in the terminals.

On July 21, Delta CEO Ed Bastian apologized to customers in a statement and revealed that the outage had left one of Delta's crew-tracking software programs "unable to effectively process the unprecedented number of changes triggered by the system shutdown". Delta CIO Rahul Samant said the program had been brought back online around 11 a.m. on July 19, but was overwhelmed by the backlog of updates awaiting processing and had been trying to catch up ever since. After the ground stop left too many crew members in the wrong places, Delta struggled to assemble enough pilots and flight attendants at airport gates to operate scheduled flights.

Many flights were repeatedly delayed and finally canceled because the one or two crew members who made it to the gate for a particular flight kept hitting their legal flight time limit before the airline could finish fully staffing the flight, and this caused the crisis to snowball as those crew and their aircraft were now in the wrong place for the following day's flights. A similar phenomenon occurred during the 2022 Southwest Airlines scheduling crisis. That same day, US Secretary of Transportation Pete Buttigieg said on social media that the US Department of Transportation had received hundreds of complaints about Delta, and reminded the airline of its legal obligations to affected passengers.

On July 22, Delta cancelled more than 1,200 flights. On 23 July, the Department of Transportation announced the launch of a formal investigation into Delta's treatment of passengers. Delta officials promised to cooperate but said the airline was focused on its recovery.

U.S. Senator Maria Cantwell (D-WA), as chair of the Senate Committee on Commerce, Science, and Transportation, wrote a letter to Bastian demanding that Delta fulfill its obligations under law. Meanwhile, U.S. Rep. Rick Larsen (D-WA), the ranking member of the House Committee on Transportation and Infrastructure, released a statement alleging "families across the country are still stranded at airports due to last week's global technology outage, and the slow response by some airlines to this meltdown has been unacceptable."

On July 23, Buttigieg estimated that over 500,000 passengers had been affected by Delta flight cancellations. He said at a press conference, "There's a lot of things I'm very concerned about, including people being on hold for hours and hours, trying to get a new flight, people having to sleep on airport floors, even accounts of unaccompanied minors being stranded in airports, unable to get on a flight". He told CBS News, "Stories about people in lines of more than a hundred people with just one customer service agent serving them at an airport, that's completely unacceptable." By then, numerous passengers had ended up in different airports than their baggage because of Delta's flight cancellations, resulting in large piles of unclaimed suitcases and other checked baggage at Delta's airport terminals around the world.

=== Return to normal operations (July 25) ===
On July 25, Delta reported to have returned to normal flight operations, after having to cancel nearly 7,000 flights.

== Aftermath ==
=== Financial cost ===
Following the disruption, Delta's CEO, Ed Bastian, stated that this incident cost the airline approximately $380 million in lost revenue and $170 million in expenses (adding up to about $550 million). He said this figure included lost revenue and tens of millions of dollars per day in compensation and hotels and was partly offset by $50 million in fuel savings. On August 9, Delta confirmed in a filing with the US Securities and Exchange Commission that over 7,000 flights had been cancelled over five days. Delta also estimated that an estimated 1.3 to 1.4 million passengers had been affected by the flight cancellations.

=== Slow recovery ===
There were vastly different experiences of major airlines in the wake of this outage. While American Airlines largely recovered by the evening of the outage and had minimal cancellations the following day, United Airlines took three days to get back on track, canceling over 1,400 flights. Delta Air Lines, however, was the hardest hit, experiencing system-wide issues lasting over five days and drawing national attention.

The differences in recovery time, especially Delta's prolonged disruption, became a point of contention among Delta, CrowdStrike, and Microsoft. Delta blamed the outage on a faulty software update from CrowdStrike, which it claimed caused a major shutdown of critical systems. Experts have pointed to several contributing factors in Delta's slow recovery, including reliance on Windows-based applications, outdated technology, and staffing challenges. Delta stated that this failure was due to large amounts of incomplete data caused by the outage. According to Delta, 60% of its mission-critical systems, including backups, operate on Microsoft Windows, requiring the manual reset of approximately 40,000 servers, a more complex process than that faced by other airlines. Delta also cited the failure of its crew-tracking system as a key factor in its delayed recovery. Without access to crew location data, the airline was unable to restore operations efficiently.

Delta accused CrowdStrike of negligence and misconduct for failing to properly test the update. CrowdStrike and Microsoft disputed Delta's explanation, attributing the delay to outdated IT infrastructure and a lack of modernization. CrowdStrike rejected these claims and sought to dismiss much of Delta's subsequent lawsuit. CrowdStrike also stated that Delta declined multiple offers of assistance from the company and its partners, though Delta later claimed those offers came too late. While acknowledging the software flaw, CrowdStrike stated it identified and corrected the issue within hours and worked to support affected customers.

In legal filings, CrowdStrike alleged that Delta had various technical deficiencies, including issues with security practices, compromised credentials, and a custom script that it said reflected poor system hygiene. Along with Microsoft, CrowdStrike suggested that Delta's outdated IT infrastructure and refusal to accept outside help contributed to the airline's delayed recovery. CrowdStrike's president publicly admitted the company made a serious error with the update.

Delta's response to the operational disruption significantly undermined Delta's reputation with consumers. Analysts noted that melting down while peers returned to normal operations had damaged Delta's image as a reliable carrier.

== Lawsuits and investigations ==
=== Delta Air Lines v. CrowdStrike ===
Delta Air Lines v. CrowdStrike
- Court: Superior Court of Fulton County, Georgia
- Full case name: Delta Air Lines, Inc. v. CrowdStrike, Inc.
- Citation: Civil action file No. 24CV013621

Case history
- Related action: CrowdStrike v. Delta Air Lines (United States District Court for the Northern District of Georgia)

Court membership
- Judge sitting: Kelly Lee Ellerbe

Delta Air Lines filed a lawsuit against CrowdStrike in October 2024, following the July 19 outage and after sending letters earlier that summer indicating potential legal action. The case was filed in Fulton County, Georgia, where Delta is headquartered.

Delta sought damages of about $550 million, citing operational losses partly offset by fuel savings. CrowdStrike disputed the claims, describing them as overstated and outside the scope of liability permitted under its contract, and argued that Delta's recovery challenges stemmed from its own IT systems and decisions.

On the same day Delta filed its case, CrowdStrike initiated a separate federal lawsuit seeking clarification that its liability was contractually limited under the Subscription Services Agreement.

Delta CEO Ed Bastian told CNBC that the company had to manually reboot about 40,000 servers during the outage. He said Delta was affected more than its competitors because it relied more heavily on CrowdStrike and Microsoft. CrowdStrike disputed this claim.

In May 2025, a Georgia state court ruled that Delta Air Lines could proceed with most of its lawsuit against cybersecurity firm CrowdStrike. Judge Kelly Lee Ellerbe of the Fulton County Superior Court allowed Delta to pursue claims of gross negligence and computer trespass.

Judge Ellerbe noted that Delta alleged CrowdStrike could have detected the programming error by testing the July update on a single computer before deployment. The ruling also cited a statement by CrowdStrike's president, who publicly acknowledged that the company had done something “horribly wrong.”

While the court allowed Delta's claims of gross negligence and computer trespass to proceed, it dismissed the airline's fraud claims related to statements made before June 2022. However, the court permitted a limited fraud claim concerning allegations that CrowdStrike falsely promised not to install an “unauthorized back door” into Delta's systems.

=== CrowdStrike v. Delta Air Lines federal countersuit ===
In response to Delta's lawsuit, CrowdStrike filed a separate lawsuit in federal court in the U.S. Northern District of Georgia. The federal case seeks a declaratory judgment concerning the contractual relationship between the two companies and aims to limit CrowdStrike's legal liability.

CrowdStrike argued that the dispute should be governed by its existing services agreement with Delta, which includes provisions limiting liability and excluding certain types of damages unless gross negligence or willful misconduct is proven, which are claims the company denies. CrowdStrike asserted that federal court is the appropriate venue due to the involvement of federal statutes cited in related passenger class actions.

In its court filing, CrowdStrike acknowledged that a software update caused the outage but stated that it promptly released a fix. The company claimed that most affected airlines recovered quickly and attributed Delta's extended disruption to the airline's IT infrastructure and its choice not to accept CrowdStrike's technical support.

=== Contract between Delta and CrowdStrike ===
CrowdStrike is a cybersecurity company known for its Falcon platform, which provides services such as endpoint protection and threat intelligence. A central component of the platform is the Falcon sensor, a software agent installed on endpoint devices to monitor and respond to security threats.

Delta Air Lines entered into a contractual relationship with CrowdStrike under a Subscription Services Agreement (SSA) effective June 30, 2022. Under the agreement, CrowdStrike was authorized to access Delta's computer systems to provide subscription-based cybersecurity services. The SSA included a warranty from CrowdStrike stating it would use commercially reasonable efforts to avoid introducing unauthorized access points, such as “back doors,” “time bombs,” “Trojan horses,” or similar software.

The agreement also limited liability. Section 9.1 capped each party's liability at twice the subscription cost, and Section 9.2 excluded liability for indirect or consequential damages, including lost revenue or goodwill. These limits did not apply in cases of gross negligence or intentional misconduct.

CrowdStrike identified the cause of the outage and reversed the faulty update 78 minutes after its initial deployment. According to the company, it worked with affected customers, including Delta Air Lines, and proided assistance through personnel, partners, and on-site support.

Delta continued to use CrowdStrike's cybersecurity products and services after the incident. CrowdStrike's stock declined sharply following the outage and subsequently recovered much of its value.

=== U.S. Department of Transportation investigation ===
On July 23, the United States Department of Transportation's Office of Aviation Consumer Protection announced it had opened an investigation into Delta Air Lines noting "continued widespread flight disruptions and reports of concerning customer service failures" while other carriers returned to normal levels of service. During the disruption, passengers had filed more than 5,000 complaints about Delta with the Department of Transportation.

Buttigieg stated that "All airline passengers have the right to be treated fairly, and I will make sure that right is upheld". The Washington Post reported that the department was investigating allegedly misleading communications from Delta that offered only credit towards future Delta flights as compensation for cancelled flights and failed to clearly notify passengers of their legal right to a cash refund.

Buttigieg charged that Delta had failed to take care of consumers during its operational collapse. The Department of Transportation's previous investigation into the 2022 Southwest Airlines scheduling crisis resulted in a $140 million fine for Southwest.

Buttigieg said, “I have made clear to Delta that we will hold them to all applicable passenger protections. In response, Delta said it “is in receipt of the Department’s notice of investigation and is fully cooperating."

=== Class action lawsuits ===
In August 2024, passengers who were stranded and denied refunds by Delta Air Lines filed a lawsuit seeking class action status against the airline. The complaint alleged that Delta's failure to recover from the CrowdStrike outage left passengers stranded in airports in the United States and abroad, in some cases thousands of miles away from their homes.

On June 19, 2025, the U.S. District Court for the Western District of Texas dismissed a federal class action lawsuit against CrowdStrike brought by airline passengers affected by the July 2024 outage. Judge Robert Pitman ruled that the claims were preempted by the Airline Deregulation Act, a federal statute that restricts state-level legal actions related to airline services. The court held that the plaintiffs' decision to sue Crowdstrike rather than the airlines did not preclude preemption under the Act. According to legal commentators, the ruling limits the ability of consumers to bring class action claims against Crowdstrike for airline service disruptions linked to the outage.

== See also ==
- History of Delta Air Lines
