= Ed Bastian =

American business executive (born 1957)

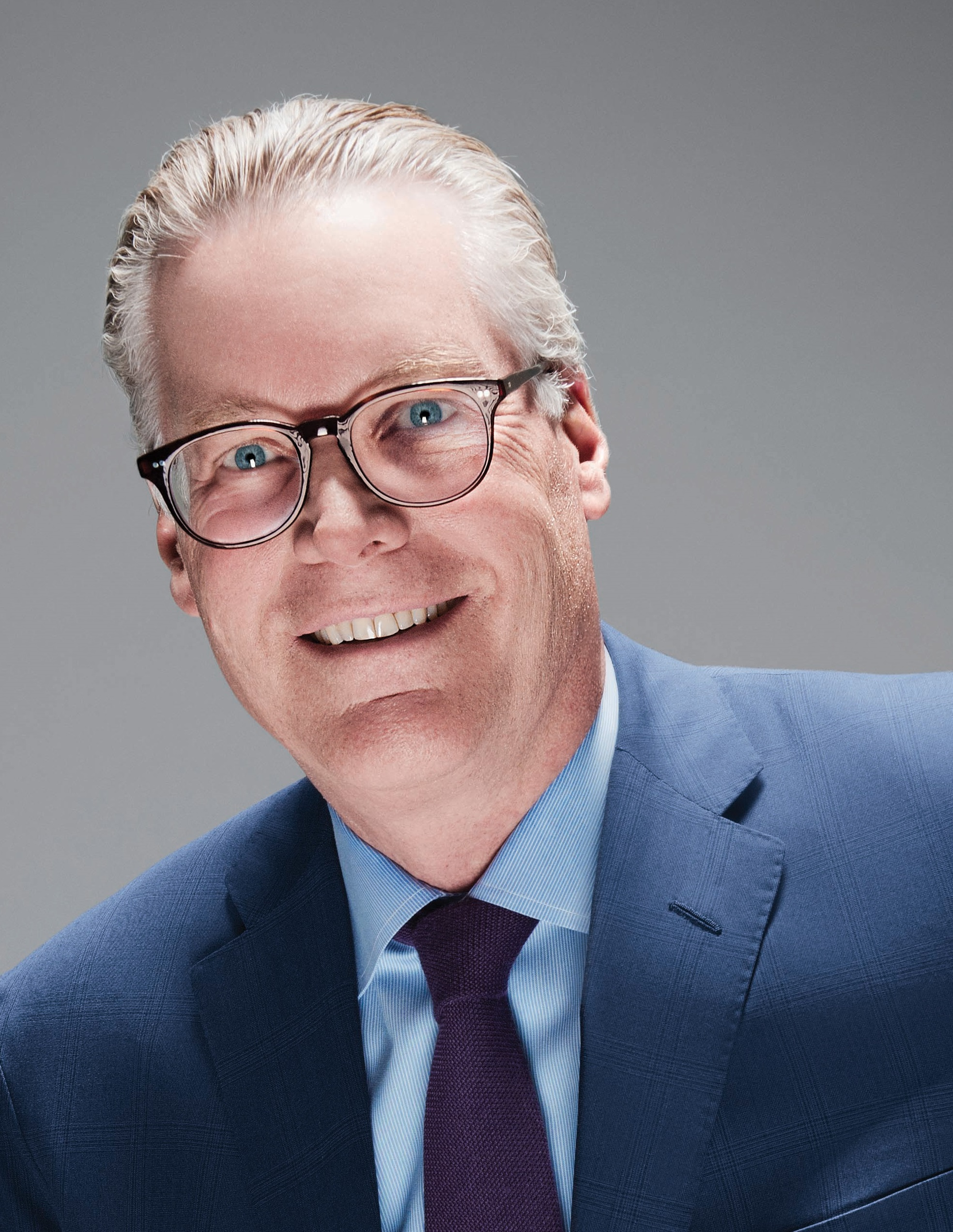
- Bastian in 2017
- Born: June 6, 1957 (age 69); Poughkeepsie, New York, U.S.
- Education: St. Bonaventure University (BBA)
- Title: Chief executive officer of Delta Air Lines
- Term: May 2, 2016 – present
- Predecessor: Richard Anderson
- Board member of: Aeroméxico, Atlanta Committee for Progress, Metro Atlanta Chamber of Commerce, Woodruff Arts Center, Virgin Atlantic, Greater Atlanta Christian School
- Children: 4

Edward Herman Bastian (born June 6, 1957) is an American business executive who has served as the chief executive officer of Delta Air Lines since May 2, 2016.

During his tenure as CEO of Delta, Bastian clashed with the Joe Biden administration over new consumer protection regulations, such as requiring automatic cash refunds for consumers after canceled flights and advertising the full price of fares upfront.

== Early life and education ==
Bastian grew up in Poughkeepsie, New York, the oldest of nine children. His father was a dentist and his mother was a dental assistant. The couple operated a dental practice from within the family home. He graduated from Our Lady of Lourdes High School in Poughkeepsie in 1975.

In 1979, Bastian received a Bachelor of Business Administration in accounting from St. Bonaventure University in St. Bonaventure, New York.

== Career ==
Bastian began his career as an auditor at Price Waterhouse (now PricewaterhouseCoopers) in New York City. In 1981, he uncovered a $50 million fraud involving the advertising firm J. Walter Thompson, which led to an investigation by the U.S. Securities and Exchange Commission (SEC) and negatively affected several executives at the firm. He was named a partner at the firm at age 31.

He later joined PepsiCo as a vice president, overseeing international finances for its Frito-Lay division. In 1998, Bastian joined Delta Air Lines as vice president of finance and controller. He was promoted to senior vice president in 2000. In 2005, he briefly left Delta to serve as chief financial officer at Acuity Brands, but returned to Delta the same year.

=== Delta Air Lines ===
Bastian returned to Delta in July 2005 to serve as chief financial officer at the request of then Delta CEO Gerald Grinstein. In 2007, he was appointed to president, a position he held until assuming the role of CEO in May 2016. His move to CEO was the first time Delta had chosen a chief executive officer from within the company since 1987.

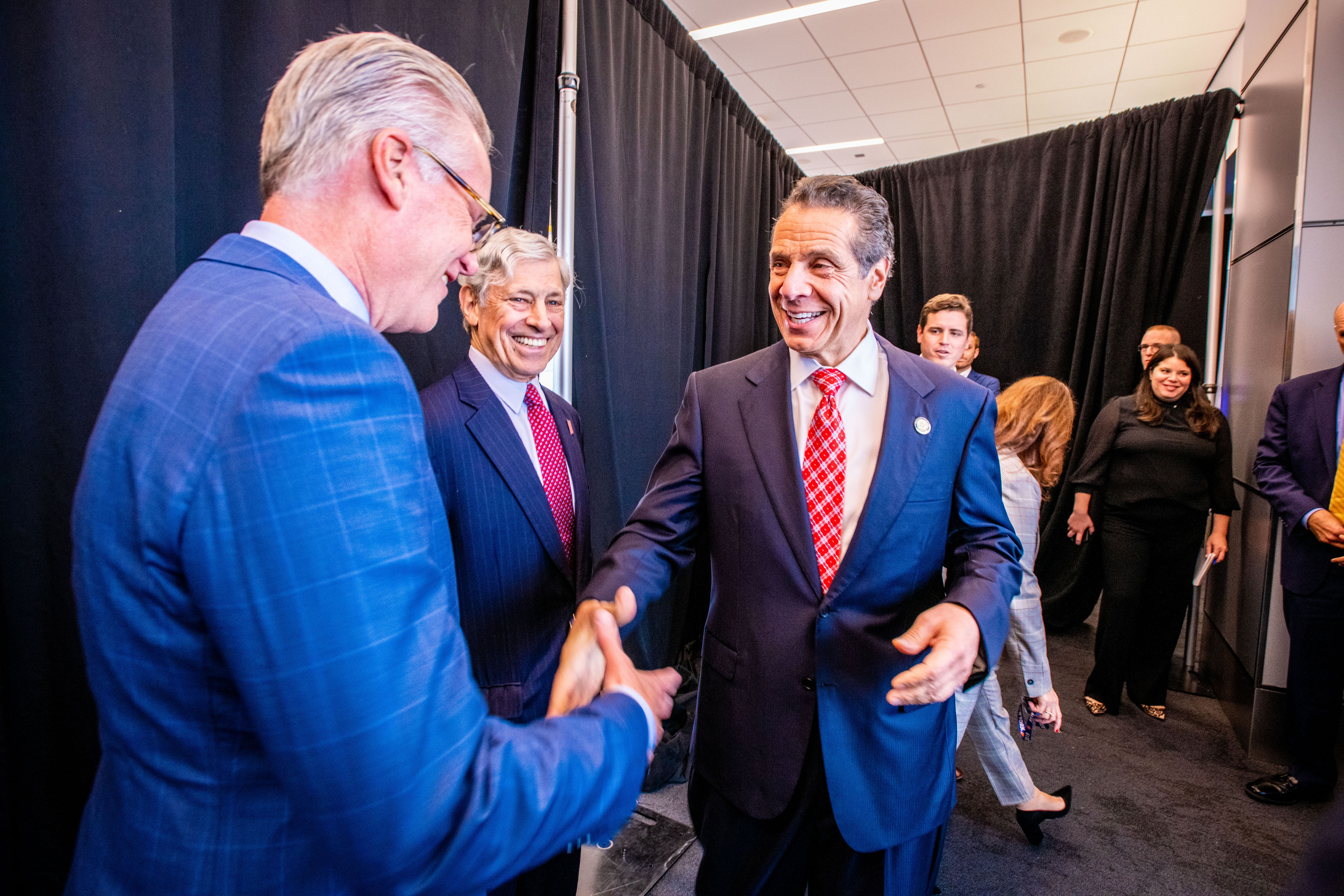
Bastian with then-New York Governor Andrew Cuomo in 2019 at the opening of Delta's terminal in LaGuardia Airport

In 2008, Bastian was involved in Delta Air Lines’ acquisition of Northwest Airlines. He played a key role in completing the merger and overseeing the integration of the two companies.

In 2019, Bastian was the only airline chief executive to skip a meeting at the White House between President Donald Trump and airline executives, justifying the decision by explaining that it conflicted with his international vacation.

In 2023, Bastian's total compensation from Delta was $34.2 million, representing a CEO-to-median-worker pay ratio of 336-to-1.

In 2024, Delta Air Lines went into a weeklong operational meltdown following the 2024 CrowdStrike incident while peer airlines quickly resumed normal operations. During and after the operational collapse, Bastian and Delta faced criticism for doing only the "bare minimum" for consumers and only after pressure from regulators and politicians while Bastian avoided interviews and attended the Olympics in Paris. The Association of Flight Attendants accused him of taking a “first class seat” to Paris instead of taking ownership of the massive meltdown. Meanwhile, a commentator described Bastian's decision to fly to Paris at the height of the meltdown as "the most Marie Antoinette thing any business could do".

After Trump's re-election victory in the 2024 presidential election, Bastian said that Trump's presidency would be a "breath of fresh air" for airlines after the government “overreach” under President Joe Biden. The Biden administration had implemented various consumer-protection regulations targeting airlines, such as automatic refunds after canceled flights and requirements that airlines to advertise the full price of fares upfront. Under Bastian's leadership, Delta sued the Biden administration for requiring greater transparency in the fees that airlines charged consumers.

In February 2025, a Delta Air Lines aircraft crashed at Toronto Pearson International Airport. In response, Bastian announced compensation of $30,000 for each passenger and coverage of medical expenses. Since becoming CEO in 2016, Bastian has emphasized premium services over low-cost strategies, with investments in upscale amenities and airport terminal improvements. In 2024, the airline distributed $1.4 billion through its profit-sharing program. Despite these initiatives, Delta continues to face challenges, including rising operational costs, increased competition in the premium travel market, and criticism from SkyMiles members following changes to the program’s benefits, as reported by Fortune.

By April 2025, amid economic chaos due to President Trump's tariffs and trade wars, Bastian said that Trump had "the wrong approach." In response to U.S. tariffs on European aircraft, Bastian announced that Delta would postpone the delivery of Airbus planes. The airline stated it would not absorb the additional costs imposed by the tariffs, which could increase the price of each aircraft by approximately 20%. Bastian described the tariffs as economically unsustainable.

=== Compensation ===
In 2025, Delta Air Lines experienced several safety incidents, including multiple engine-related emergencies. Despite these issues and a 39% decline in shareholder value, Bastian received $34.2 million in total compensation for 2023, the highest among airline industry CEOs. His compensation package did not include metrics related to operational safety.

== 2024 Delta Air Lines disruption ==
In July 2024, Delta Air Lines, a major U.S. carrier and one of the largest airlines in the world, experienced an operational disruption following the 2024 CrowdStrike outages including the cancelation of over 1,200 flights. The incident began on the morning of Friday, July 19 when a ground stop was issued by major carriers. While other carriers quickly recovered, the crisis continued for Delta until it was able to resume normal flight operations on July 25. Delta confirmed that the crisis resulted in the cancellation of over 7,000 flights over the five days of the disruption and affected over 1.3 million passengers.

The U.S. Department of Transportation (DOT) opened an investigation into Delta Air Lines' response to the outage. The department later classified the flight delays and cancellations resulting from the July 19, 2024, incident as a "controllable" event, placing responsibility for the disruptions on the airline.

Delta Air Lines reported a $500 million loss due to the system crash.

Bastian was criticized for his response to the crisis, particularly for traveling to Paris for the Olympics while the company was still addressing operational disruptions. The Association of Flight Attendants publicly objected to his decision, noting that he flew first class to Paris instead of staying in Atlanta to help manage the situation.

== Controversies ==
Delta Air Lines faced criticism in 2025 after its official social media account expressed sympathy for a post that compared Palestinian flag pins worn by flight attendants to “Hamas badges.” Delta removed the post, provided counseling to the employee involved, and restricted approved uniform pins to only U.S. flags—a decision that was criticized by some groups as discriminatory.

On Sept 29, 2026 Elon Musk predicted that Bastian's snub of Starlink would end up costing him his job.

== Personal life ==
Bastian is divorced with four children. He splits his time between Atlanta, where Delta Air Lines is headquartered, and Florida. As of 2025, he is engaged to Debra Strand.

== Awards and recognition ==
- In 2025, Bastian was recognized with the Tony Jannus Award for major and lasting contributions to the commercial aviation industry, received the Yale Legend in Leadership Award, and Most Admired CEO Lifetime Achievement Award.
- In 2024, Georgia Trend named Bastian Georgian of the Year.
- In 2023, Chief Executive named Bastian CEO of the Year.
- In 2021, Bastian assumed the role of Chairman for the Metro Atlanta Chamber of Commerce.
- In 2018, Fortune named him to its annual World's 50 Greatest Leaders list.
- On February 17, 2018, Georgia Governor Nathan Deal and the Georgia Historical Society inducted Bastian to the Georgia Trustees, the highest honor an individual can receive from the state.
- In 2017, Bastian was honored by the Atlanta Business Chronicle as one of Atlanta's Most Admired CEOs.
