= Delta Air Lines Flight 318 =

1953 aviation accident

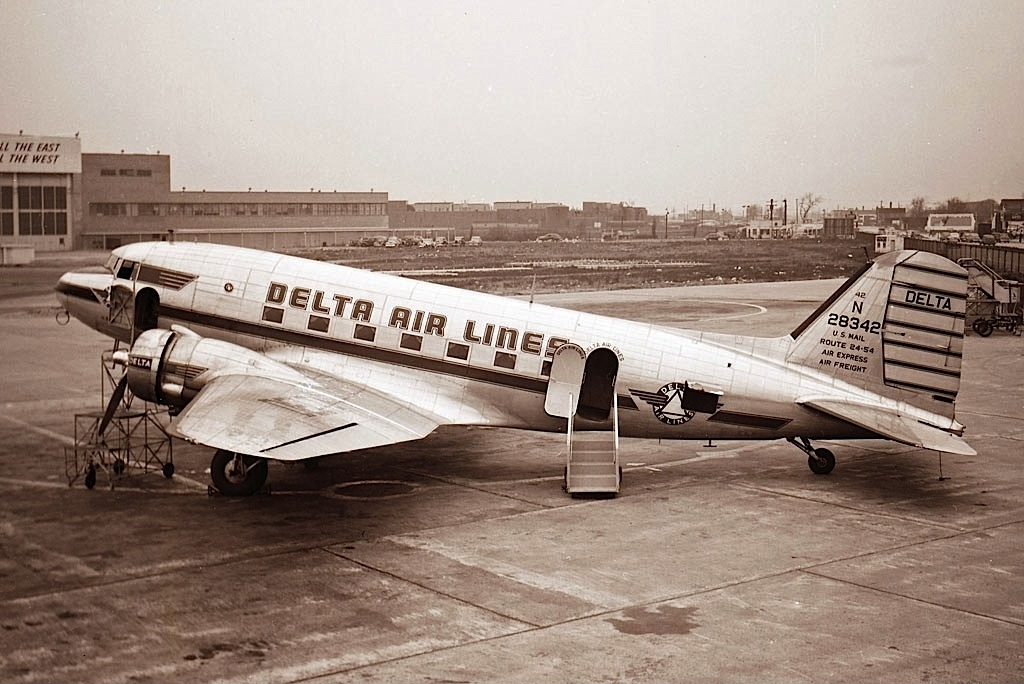
- A Delta Air Lines DC-3 in Chicago in 1949, similar to the aircraft involved.

Accident
- Date: May 17, 1953
- Summary: Loss of control after entering a downdraft in a thunderstorm
- Site: 21 km (13 miles) East of Marshall, Texas, United States

Aircraft
- Aircraft type: Douglas DC-3
- Operator: Delta Air Lines
- IATA flight No.: DL318
- ICAO flight No.: DAL318
- Call sign: DELTA 318
- Registration: N28345
- Flight origin: Dallas Love Field, Texas, United States
- Stopover: Shreveport Regional Airport, Louisiana, United States
- Destination: Atlanta Municipal Airport, Georgia, United States
- Occupants: 20
- Passengers: 17
- Crew: 3
- Fatalities: 19
- Injuries: 1
- Survivors: 1

The crash of Delta Air Lines Flight 318 was an accident involving a Douglas DC-3 of the American airline Delta Air Lines 13 miles (21 km) east of Marshall, Texas, United States on May 17, 1953, killing all but one of the 20 people on board.

== Crew ==
Flight 318 was under the command of Captain Douglas B. Yolk, who had a total of 7,120 hours of flight experience, all of which on the Douglas DC-3. The plane's First Officer was James P. Stewart, who had 2,114 hours of total flight experience, including 803 hours on the DC-3. Also on board was one flight attendant, Joanne Carlson.

== Accident ==
Delta Air Lines Flight 318 took off from Dallas Love Field in Dallas, Texas, United States at 1:10 pm on May 17, 1953, on a scheduled flight to Atlanta, Georgia, United States with a stopover at Shreveport Regional Airport in Shreveport, Louisiana, United States carrying 3 crew and 17 passengers. While on route, the pilots were warned by ATC about possible thunderstorms on their flight route. At 2:12 pm, Flight 318 was cleared by the Shreveport Control Tower to make a hard right turn on approach to Runway 13. Flight 318 confirmed the message and requested on update on the weather conditions at Shreveport. The weather was described as having dark scattered clouds at 1,000 ft (305 m) with a ceiling estimate of 4,000 ft (1,219 m) and overcast at 20,000 ft (6,096 m), visibility for 10 miles (16 km), and a thunderstorm which contained a light rain shower some 15 miles (24 km) west of Shreveport. Flight 318's crew acknowledged the message, however the crew never altered the plane's course to avoid the thunderstorm.

Flight 318 entered the storm at an altitude of 2,500 ft (762 m) and was immediately met with lightning, hail, heavy rain, high winds and severe turbulence. A strong downdraft eventually forced the plane to the ground, where it ended up hitting the tree tops at a shallow angle of descent. The plane continued on, cutting through the trees for another 500 feet (150 m) during which the aircraft struck the ground, skidding for another 370 feet (110 m) before the aircraft finally came to a stop and partially burned out. When ATC radioed Flight 318 for a position update at 2:16 pm, they received no reply. Further attempts to contact the flight also proved unsuccessful, when at 2:28 pm, ATC was informed that Flight 318 had crashed near Marshall, Texas. All three crew members were killed in the crash alongside 16 of the 17 passengers on board. The sole survivor suffered serious injuries.

== Aircraft ==
The Douglas DC-3 involved, registered N28345 (msn 2224) was built in 1940 and had accumulated 39,000 flight hours during its 13 years of service.

== Aftermath ==
The aircraft was destroyed in the accident, while all but one of the 20 occupants of the flight were killed. An investigation of the accident revealed that the aircraft had been forced to the ground by a sudden downdraft which was caused by the thunderstorm it was flying in at the time, resulting in the loss of control over the aircraft and subsequent crash. A contributing factor to the crash was the captain's decision to go into the storm rather than to avoid it as dictated by company directives.

== See also ==
Delta Air Lines Flight 191, another Delta Air Lines crash where the aircraft entered a microburst, was forced down into the ground, and crashed.
