= Delta Air Lines Flight 554 =

1996 aviation accident in New York

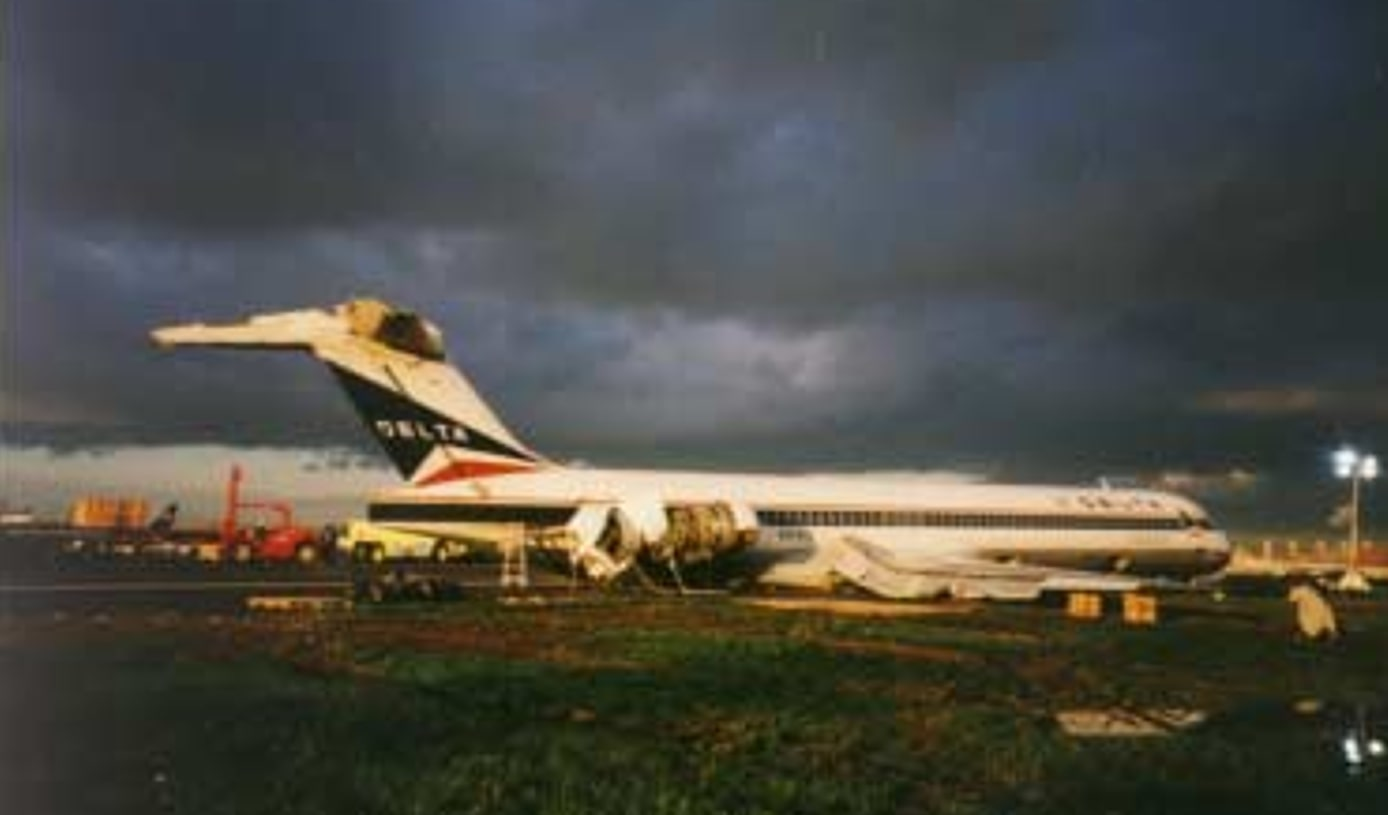
- The aircraft after crashing at LaGuardia Airport

Accident
- Date: October 19, 1996
- Summary: Aircraft collided with approach lighting system due to pilot's monovision contact lenses
- Site: LaGuardia Airport, New York City, United States; 40°46′33.6″N 73°51′47.9″W

Aircraft
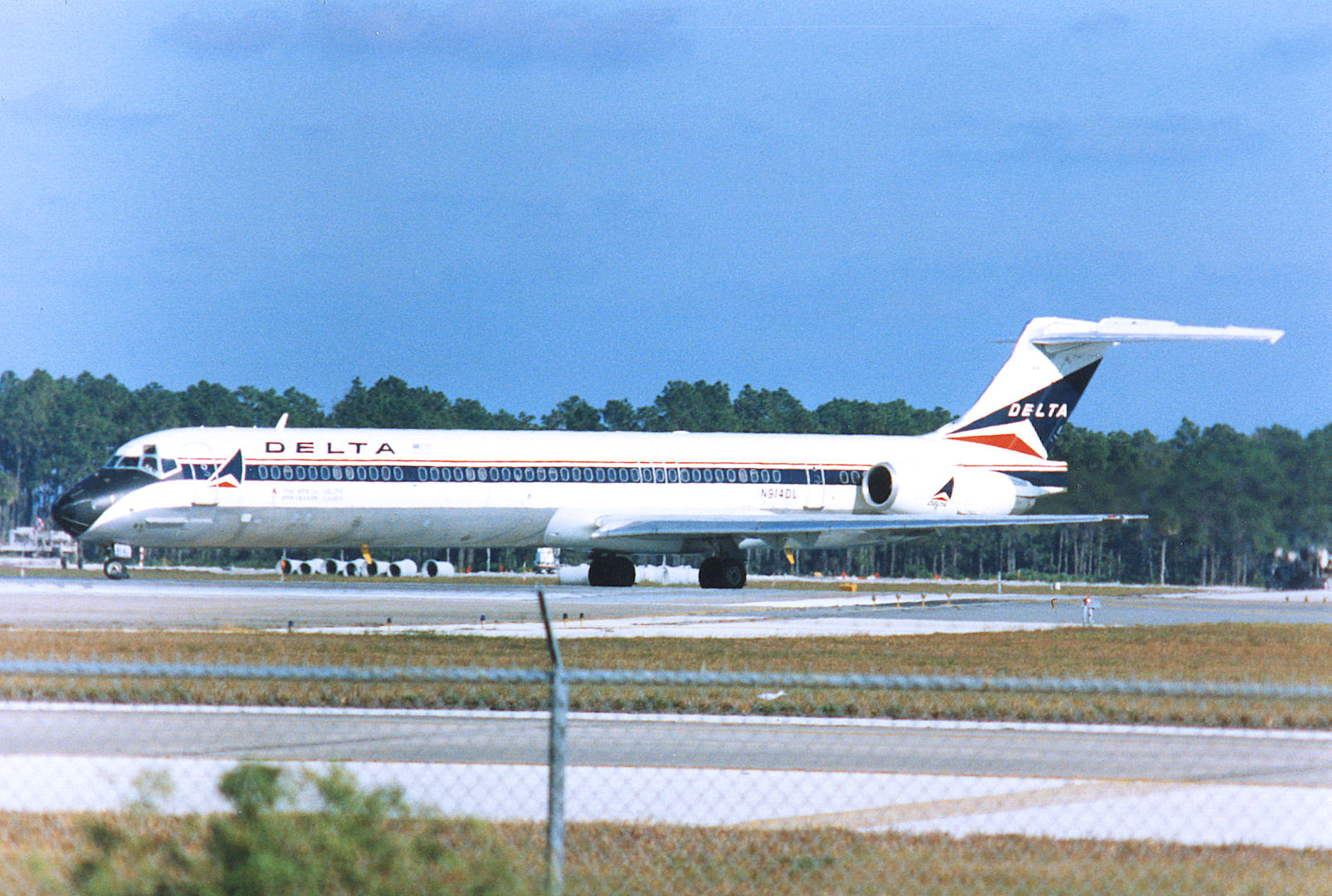
- N914DL, the aircraft involved in the accident, seen in 1995
- Aircraft type: McDonnell Douglas MD-88
- Operator: Delta Air Lines
- IATA flight No.: DL554
- ICAO flight No.: DAL554
- Call sign: DELTA 554
- Registration: N914DL
- Flight origin: Hartsfield-Jackson Atlanta International Airport, Atlanta, United States
- Destination: LaGuardia Airport, New York, United States
- Occupants: 63
- Passengers: 58
- Crew: 5
- Fatalities: 0
- Injuries: 5
- Survivors: 63

Delta Air Lines Flight 554 was a scheduled Delta Air Lines domestic passenger flight between Atlanta and New York City's LaGuardia Airport. On October 19, 1996, the McDonnell Douglas MD-88 aircraft struck the approach light structure and the vertical edge of the concrete landing deck during its approach to land on Runway 13 at LaGuardia Airport. The aircraft proceeded to skid 2,700 feet down the runway before coming to a rest. Of the 58 passengers and 5 crew members aboard, 5 received minor injuries. The aircraft was substantially damaged and repaired for $14 million.

The final report by the National Transportation Safety Board (NTSB) found that the probable cause of the accident was the inability of the captain, because of his use of monovision contact lenses, to overcome his misperception of the aircraft's position relative to the runway during the visual portion of the approach.

== Background ==
=== Aircraft ===
The aircraft involved was a McDonnell Douglas MD-88, registered as N914DL, serial number 49545. The airplane was purchased from McDonnell Douglas and was put into service in June 1988. The aircraft was powered by two Pratt & Whitney JT8D-219 turbofan engines.

=== Crew ===
In command was Captain Joseph G. Broker, a 48-year-old who was hired by Delta on September 5, 1978. He held an airline transport pilot (ATP) certificate with airplane single-engine land privileges, and MD-88 and Cessna 500 type ratings. The captain had about 10 years of civilian and military flight experience before he joined Delta Air Lines, including 3,320 total flight hours in North American F-100 Super Sabres.

The first officer was Henry Grady Lane, age 38. He was hired by Delta on May 30, 1988. He held an ATP certificate with airplane multiengine land and instrument ratings. He also had commercial pilot privileges for airplane single-engine land. He had no restrictions or limitations on his most recent medical certificate. The first officer had 6 years of military flight experience in the U.S. Air Force. He began his Delta career as a flight engineer on a Boeing 727 and performed flight crew member duties in the Lockheed L-1011 TriStar and McDonnell Douglas DC-9 aircraft before he transitioned to being a first officer on the MD-88 in November 1992.

== History of the flight ==
Flight 554 took off from Hartsfield-Jackson Atlanta International Airport at 2:41 PM EST, after leaving the gate at 2:31 PM. The departure, climb, and en route portions of the flight proceeded uneventfully, although they experienced turbulence at their cruising altitude of 37,000 feet (11,000 m).

The aircraft began its descent from 3,000 feet (900 m) on the ILS DME approach to runway 13. The weather at the time was an 800 feet (240 m) broken ceiling, with a visibility of 0.5 miles (0.8 km) in the fog and a runway visual range of 3,000 feet (900 m).

== Accident ==
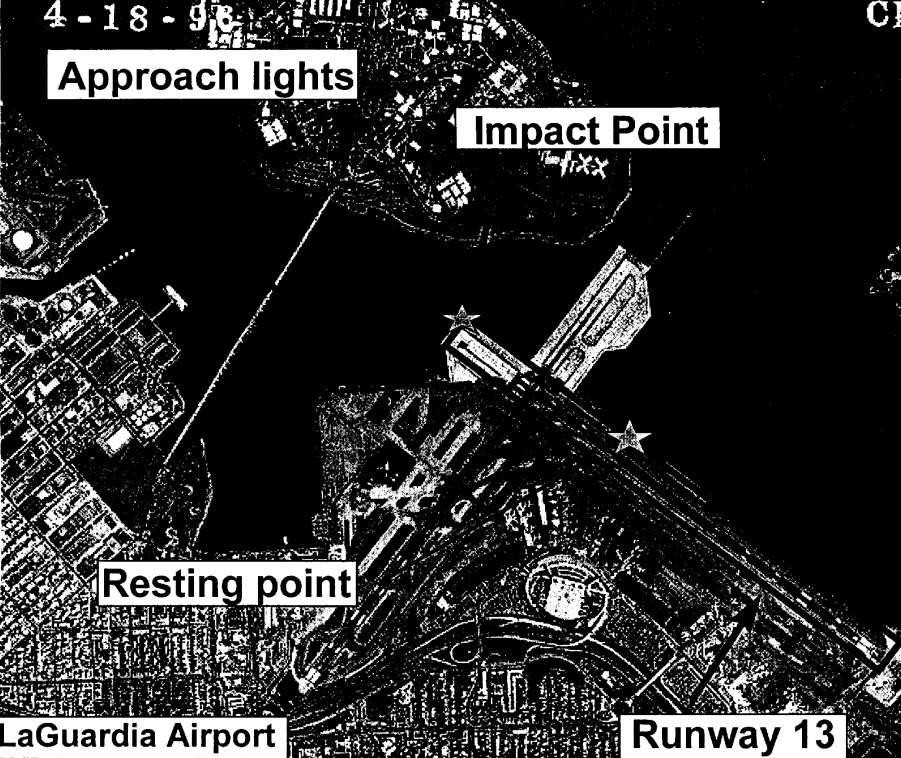
LaGuardia Airport, with runway 13 approach lights, the point of initial impact, and the point where the airplane came to rest on runway 13 depicted.

At 4:38 PM EST, LaGuardia ATCT stated, "You are cleared to land, Delta five fifty-four," and the first officer acknowledged the landing clearance. The CVR recorded the sound of the ground proximity warning system (GPWS) announcing minimums. About a second later, the captain stated that he had the approach lights in sight.

According to the CVR transcript, the captain began to reduce the engine power, and the first officer stated, "Nose up." The CVR recorded the sound of the GPWS "sink rate" warning, followed by sounds of impact at 4:38:36.5 PM EST.

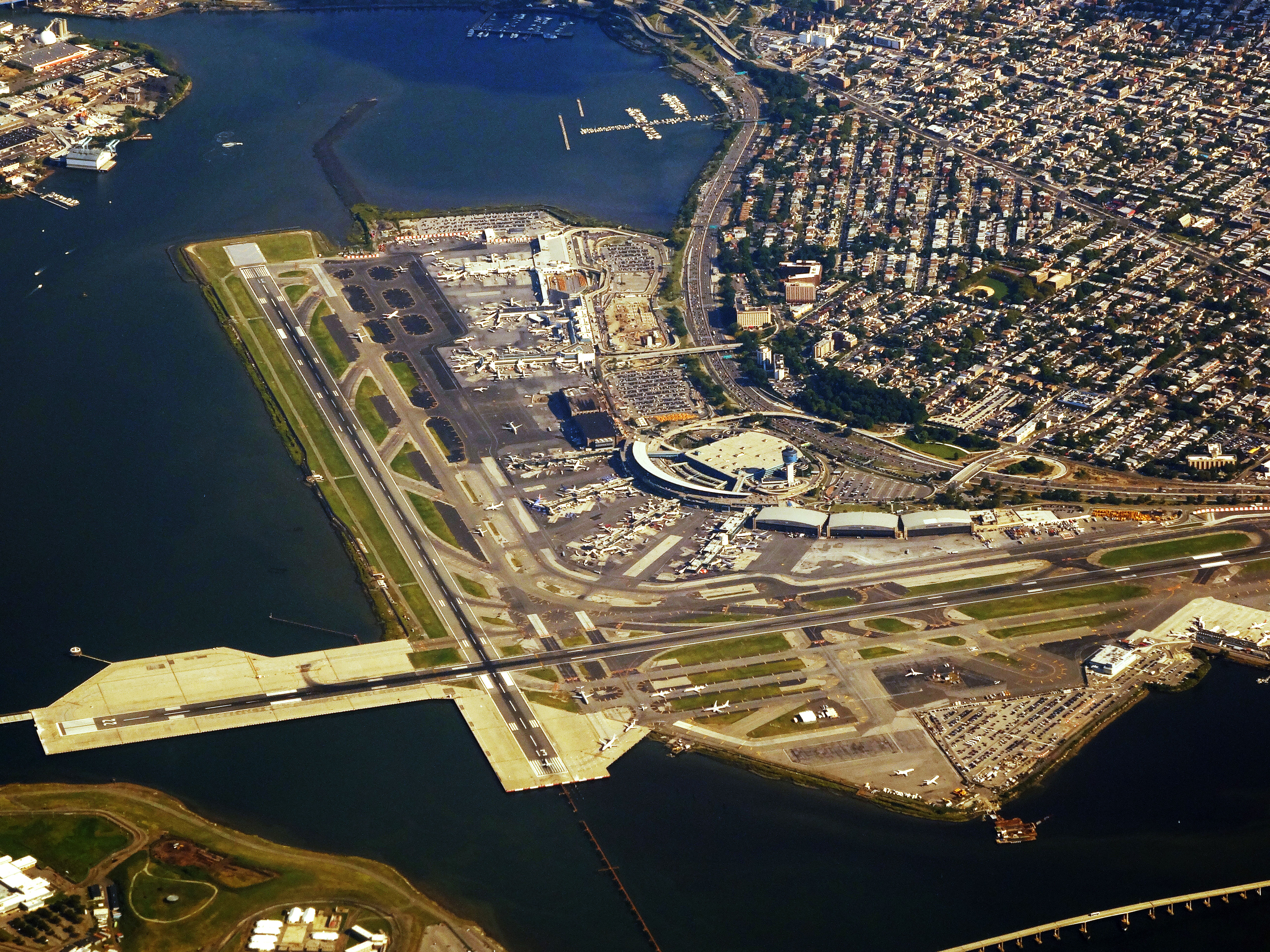
LaGuardia Airport. Runway 13 starts at the bottom-center of the photo and extends towards the top left.

The right wing of the airplane struck the approach light structure in Flushing Bay and the vertical edge of the concrete runway deck, and then skidded approximately 2,700 feet down the 7,000 ft. runway 13 on its lower fuselage and nose landing gear before it came to a stop.

The nose landing gear came to a stop on the pavement, with the fuselage oriented on a 345° heading; the left wing extended towards the runway centerline, and the right wing extended over the wet, grassy area next to the runway. Wreckage was scattered across the length of the 2,700 ft. skid. According to flight and cabin crewmember statements, after the airplane came to a stop, the pilots began to assess the damage to the airplane and determine whether an emergency evacuation was warranted, while the flight attendants picked up their interphone handsets and awaited instructions.

About 74 seconds after the airplane came to a stop (about 94 seconds after impact), the captain issued the emergency evacuation command after a non-revenue Delta pilot and Jennifer Teas, the Flight Attendant In Charge (FAIC) reported that they smelled jet fuel fumes in the cabin, as 600 gallons of jet fuel leaked from the aircraft's right wing. All aircraft occupants exited through the left front door slide.

== Investigation ==
The NTSB investigated the accident and determined that the probable cause was due to the inability of the captain, because of his use of monovision contact lenses, to overcome his misperception of the airplane's position relative to the runway during the visual portion of the approach. This misperception occurred because of visual illusions produced by the approach over water in limited light conditions, the absence of visible ground features, the rain and fog, and the irregular spacing of the runway lights. Contributing to the accident was the lack of instantaneous vertical speed information available to the pilot not flying, and the incomplete guidance available to optometrists, aviation medical examiners, and pilots regarding the prescription of unapproved monovision contact lenses for use by pilots.

== See also ==
- Delta Air Lines Flight 1086, a Delta flight that flew an identical route and also crashed at Runway 13 at LaGuardia
