= Delta Air Lines Flight 1080 =

Aviation incident in 1977

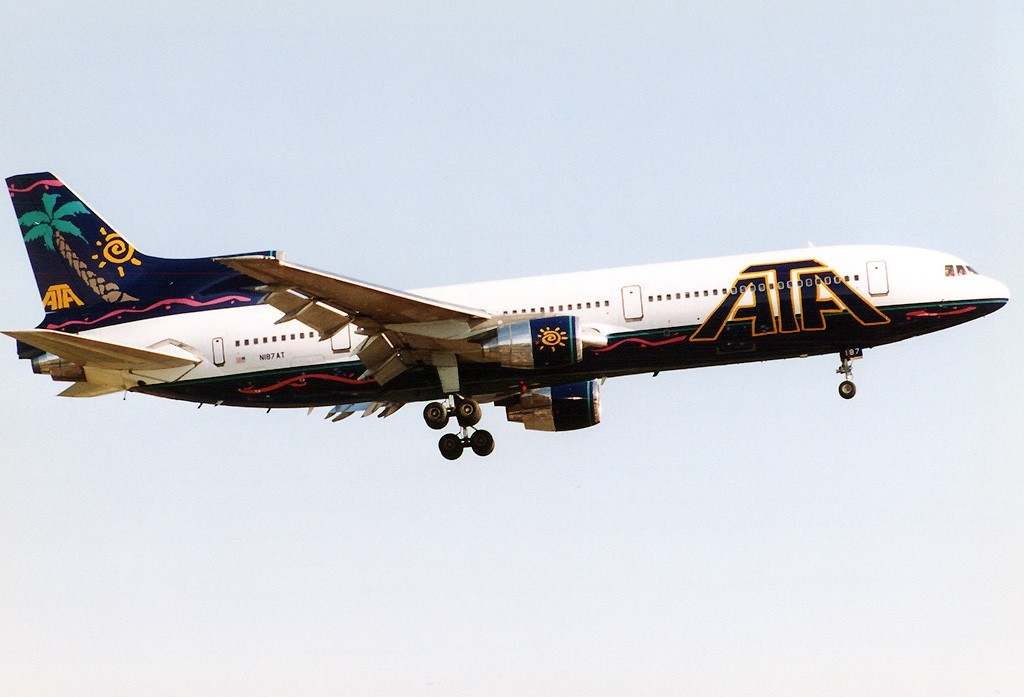
- The aircraft involved in the incident, still flying almost twenty years later (in 1996), by then being operated by American Trans Air (ATA)

Incident
- Date: April 12, 1977
- Summary: Loss of pitch control due to mechanical failure and jamming of the elevator and elevator tab control system
- Site: Los Angeles International Airport, Los Angeles, California, United States

Aircraft
- Aircraft type: Lockheed L-1011-385-1 Tristar
- Operator: Delta Air Lines
- IATA flight No.: DL1080
- ICAO flight No.: DAL1080
- Call sign: DELTA 1080
- Registration: N707DA
- Flight origin: San Diego International Airport
- 1st stopover: Los Angeles International Airport
- 2nd stopover: Dallas/Fort Worth International Airport
- Last stopover: Louis Armstrong New Orleans International Airport
- Destination: Hartsfield–Jackson Atlanta International Airport
- Occupants: 52
- Passengers: 41
- Crew: 11
- Fatalities: 0
- Survivors: 52

Delta Air Lines Flight 1080 was a scheduled flight from San Diego, California, to Atlanta, Georgia, notable for the incident that occurred on April 12, 1977, during the San Diego to Los Angeles leg of the flight. Unbeknownst to the crew, the Lockheed L-1011 TriStar's left elevator had become stuck in a fully upwards position. This led to the aircraft pitching up aggressively and causing the aircraft to lose speed and nearly stall. The pitching force was difficult to overcome by fully pushing the control column, but was counteracted by reducing the thrust on the L-1011's wing engines but not the tail engine. The differential thrust, along with moving all the passengers as far forward as possible in the cabin, pitched the nose down, and subsequently allowed the pilots to land the aircraft. The entire incident lasted 55 minutes.

== Background ==
=== Aircraft ===
The aircraft was a two-year-old Lockheed L-1011-385-1 TriStar registered as N707DA. It was delivered to Delta Air Lines on 24 May 1974. At the time of the accident, the aircraft had registered 5,000 flight hours.

=== Crew ===
In command was 54-year-old Captain Jack McMahan. The first officer was 42-year-old Wilbur Radford, and 30-year-old Flight Engineer Steven Heidt. This was Heidt's first day as a L-1011 Flight Engineer. There were eight flight attendants on board the aircraft.

== Incident timeline ==
=== Takeoff ===
At 23:53 PST (07:53 UTC), the conditions were reported as 800 ft of overcast, visibility 5 miles (8 km), temperature 58 °F (14 °C), winds 260° at 8 mph (13 km/h). While taxiing to runway 27, the crew performed a flight control check, and during this check the left stabilizer jammed upwards. As the aircraft rolled down the runway, the takeoff was described as "normal" until Vr speed 126 kn (233 km/h; 145 mph) the nose rotated off the ground with little to no pull on the control column.

=== Initial problems ===
When the aircraft suddenly pitched up, it was found to be slightly controllable, although McMahan did push the column fully forward with little response. The captain then checked the stabilizer trim setting; it was set at the correct 3.5° nose up. The aircraft seemed to stop pitching up at 15°, the gear was retracted and the plane seemed to return to a normal flight condition. At 400 ft (120 m), the aircraft began pitching up again, from 15° to 18°. The crew kept trying to use the thumbwheel trim after the movement of the thumbwheel stopped. The controls were described as very sluggish, with little response. The back-up system, which overrides the electric trim, was used, but it didn't result in a change in control. The Surface Position Indicator (SPI) showed the stabilizer was already 'zeroed out', so the pilots were still puzzled as to why the aircraft kept pitching upwards. Heidt, at the request of McMahan, looked over and checked the hydraulic systems, as McMahan believed that one of the hydraulic systems had failed. While Radford conducted an area test, McMahan unlatched and latched any switches associated with trim, and Heidt double checked the hydraulics and checked for any popped circuit breakers. By the time the aircraft reached 3,000 ft (900 m), all procedures for jammed controls, trim, axis jam, and hydraulic malfunctions had been performed with no change in control. The crew informed San Diego Departure Control that they were experiencing a pitch issue, and instead of switching frequencies, they requested to stay with departure control. They were later handed off to a coast controller after enough controllability was regained.

=== Near stall ===
The aircraft then began a pitch up maneuver, unable to be counteracted by both the first officer and the captain, climbing at about 5,000 ft/min (25 m/s), with the airspeed decaying to below V2 speed. While the crew were desperately trying to push the nose down, flight attendants were gathering all the passengers and sending them to sit as far forward as possible. The captain, perhaps thinking in a last ditch effort to regain control, fully reduced thrust on the number one and three engines, and maintained full power on the number two (central tail) engine. This worked in getting the nose down and established enough controllability that the crew now made an attempt back towards the airport.

=== Returning to the airport ===
With some controllability established, the crew made a turn towards Los Angeles International Airport. The crew, after lining up with the runway, attempted an instrument approach. This approach was successful in getting the aircraft on the ground at LAX. Reverse thrust was used on all the engines, heavily on engines 1 & 3, with low power on engine 2. The crew taxied the aircraft back to the gate and passengers were disembarked and re-booked onto another flight.

== Investigation ==
The investigation found that the pressurization and depressurization of the L-1011 during multiple flight cycles had caused water to be pushed inside the left elevator aft drive quadrant (also referred to as the bell crank), heavily corroding it and causing it to become jammed during a routine control surfaces check prior to takeoff. The FAA issued an emergency airworthiness directive instructing airlines to do a check of the bearing. This verification, however, was not sufficient to prevent takeoff with a jammed elevator; and a similar incident followed two months later. The FAA then made it mandatory for crews to inspect the elevators before each takeoff.

== Aftermath ==
As a result of the incident, Lockheed redesigned the elevator systems to be redundant upon failure of the bearings, as well as adding a seal to the bearing and a deflector to reduce the amount of water contacting the part. Lockheed also modified the pilot's manual to improve the Pitch Axis Control Assist Procedures. The FAA further made it mandatory for pilots to be informed of these changes.

For his skill in landing the crippled aircraft, the captain, Jack McMahan, was awarded the FAA's Distinguished Service Award.

== See also ==
- Alaska Airlines Flight 261, a McDonnell Douglas MD-83 that suffered a failure of the jackscrew in the stabilizer, leading to the deaths of 88 people.
- Aeroflot Flight 8641, a Yakovlev Yak-42 that suffered a jackscrew failure due to metal fatigue and a design flaw resulting in 132 deaths.
