= Unifi Aviation =

Aviation ground handling services in North America

Unifi Aviation, LLC
- Formerly: DAL Global Services
- Type: Joint venture
- Headquarters: Atlanta, Georgia, United States
- Number of locations: 200 (2024)
- Area served: United States
- Owner: Argenbright Holdings (80%); Delta Air Lines (20%)
- Number of employees: 40,000 (2025)
- Subsidiaries: Unifi Service ERMC Aviation Unifi Security
- Website: unifiservice.com

Unifi Aviation, LLC is the largest aviation ground handling services in North America. Unifi was formed late 2018, after Delta Air Lines sold a stake of its subsidiary, DAL Global Services, to Argenbright Holdings. Unifi is jointly owned by Argenbright, who owns 80 of the company and Delta, who owns 20%.

In February 2020, the company rebranded as Unifi. Unifi provides services such as aircraft ground handling, ground support equipment maintenance, cargo handling, security and janitorial. The company operates in around 200 locations and employs over 20,000 people.

In August 2023, a lawsuit was filed against Unifi by a passenger who witnessed its employee commit suicide on the job in June 2023 by placing himself to be sucked into the engine of a Delta Air Lines plane at San Antonio International Airport. The plaintiff stated she witnessed the employee getting torn apart by the engine. It is noted that the deceased had given a suicide note to his supervisor prior to the incident. In November 2024, a federal judge tossed the lawsuit after ruling that the passenger failed to prove her claims of "intentional infliction of emotional distress" and "gross negligence in hiring supervision and retention."

== See also ==
- Delta Global Staffing
