= List of accidents and incidents at LaGuardia Airport =

LaGuardia Airport has been the site of many aviation accidents and incidents.

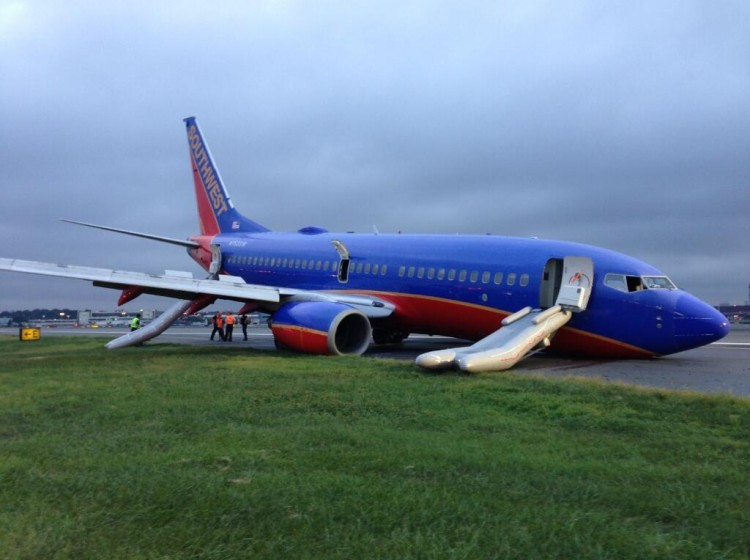
Southwest Flight 345 after evacuation in 2013, with emergency slides deployed

== 1945 ==
December 30
Eastern Air Lines Flight 14 overran the runway on landing and came to rest in Flushing Bay, one passenger was killed.

== 1947 ==
May 29
United Airlines Flight 521 crashed after aborting takeoff, 43 of the 48 aboard were killed.
August 8
American Airlines Flight 765, a cargo flight, crashed into Flushing Bay while returning to LGA due to engine problems, both pilots and one passenger of the 5 aboard died.

== 1957 ==
February 1
Northeast Airlines Flight 823 crashed on takeoff into Rikers Island. Of 101 people aboard, 20 were killed.

== 1959 ==
February 3
American Airlines Flight 320 crashed on approach into the East River. Of 73 people aboard, 65 were killed.

== 1960 ==
December 16
Trans World Airlines Flight 266, a Lockheed Super Constellation bound for LaGuardia, collided with a United Airlines Douglas DC-8 over Staten Island, killing all 128 people on board both airliners and 6 more on the ground.

== 1971 ==
January 4
A Douglas C-47A N7 of the Federal Aviation Administration crashed on approach to LaGuardia Airport. The aircraft was on a flight from Johnstown–Cambria County Airport, Johnstown, Pennsylvania. The cause of the accident was wind shear. No casualties reported.

== 1975 ==
December 29
A bomb detonated near TWA baggage reclaim terminal at LaGuardia Airport. The blast killed 11 people and seriously injured 75 others. The crime remains unsolved.

== 1989 ==
September 20
USAir Flight 5050 bound for Charlotte/Douglas International Airport in Charlotte, North Carolina, crashed after aborting takeoff and rolling off the end of the runway into the East River. The plane broke into three pieces, and two passengers died as a result.

== 1992 ==
March 22
USAir Flight 405 bound for Cleveland Hopkins International Airport in Cleveland, Ohio, crashed on takeoff at LaGuardia because of icing on its wings. Of 51 people aboard, 27 were killed.

== 1994 ==
March 2
Continental Airlines Flight 795 to Denver, Colorado, aborted takeoff in a snowstorm and skidded down the runway into a ditch. 29 passengers and one crew member suffered only minor injuries during evacuation of the aircraft.

== 1996 ==
October 19
Delta Air Lines Flight 554, a McDonnell Douglas MD-88 was on an early evening ILS/DME approach to runway 13, when right before touchdown, the right wing struck approach lights, then struck the runway and sheared off the landing gear. The plane skidded down the runway for 2,700 feet (900 yd; 820 m). There were 3 minor injuries among the 63 passengers and crew on board. The aircraft was repaired and placed back into service.

== 2001 ==
September 11
Midwest Airlines Flight 007 was involved in a near-miss with United Airlines Flight 175 while on approach, leading to a pair of very quick and steep dives. 4 people received minor injuries and the aircraft received minor damage. The flight landed safely at LaGuardia a few minutes later.

== 2009 ==
January 15
US Airways Flight 1549, an Airbus A320 departing for Charlotte/Douglas International Airport ditched in the Hudson River after losing both engines as a result of multiple bird strikes at an altitude of 3,000 feet (910 m); all 150 passengers and 5 crew members successfully evacuated.

== 2013 ==
July 22
Southwest Airlines Flight 345, a Boeing 737-700 registration N753SW, from Nashville performed a hard landing that collapsed the nose gear of the aircraft. Nine people were injured and the plane was written off as a total loss.

== 2015 ==
March 5
Delta Air Lines Flight 1086 from Atlanta skidded off the runway on landing in snowy weather. The McDonnell Douglas MD-88 operating the flight, N909DL, was severely damaged. Twenty-four people sustained minor injuries during evacuation via the emergency chutes.

== 2016 ==
October 27
A Boeing 737-700 operated by the new Eastern Air Lines as Flight 3452—carrying Mike Pence, then the Republican vice presidential nominee and the governor of Indiana—skidded off Runway 22 after landing. The aircraft was ultimately stopped by the EMAS bed just before the Grand Central Parkway. No one was injured in the incident.

== 2025 ==
October 1
A CRJ-900 operated by Endeavor Air on behalf of Delta Air Lines was preparing to take off from the airport for Virginia’s Roanoke–Blacksburg Regional Airport when it collided at the intersection of two taxiways with another CRJ-900 operated by the same airline which had just arrived from North Carolina’s Charlotte Douglas International Airport. The first aircraft damaged the nose and the cockpit of the second aircraft with one of its wings, while the wing of the first aircraft broke during the collision. One flight attendant aboard one of the planes was injured during the collision.

== 2026 ==
March 22
A CRJ-900 operating as Air Canada Express Flight 8646 collided upon landing with an airport fire engine (an Oshkosh Striker 1500) that was attempting to cross a runway to assist another flight (United Airlines Flight 2384). Of the 72 passengers and 4 crew, 41 were sent to the hospital. Thirty-two were released, but some had been seriously injured. The two officers who were in the engine were hospitalized but stable. One of the officers, Adrian Baez, was released from the hospital on March 23. As of March 27, the second officer, Sergeant Michael Orsillo, is still recovering. Both of the pilots died after the aircraft sustained substantial damage to the nose. Following this collision, LaGuardia Airport was closed until 2:00 PM on March 23.
