= March 2015 North American winter storm =

North American winter storm in March 2015

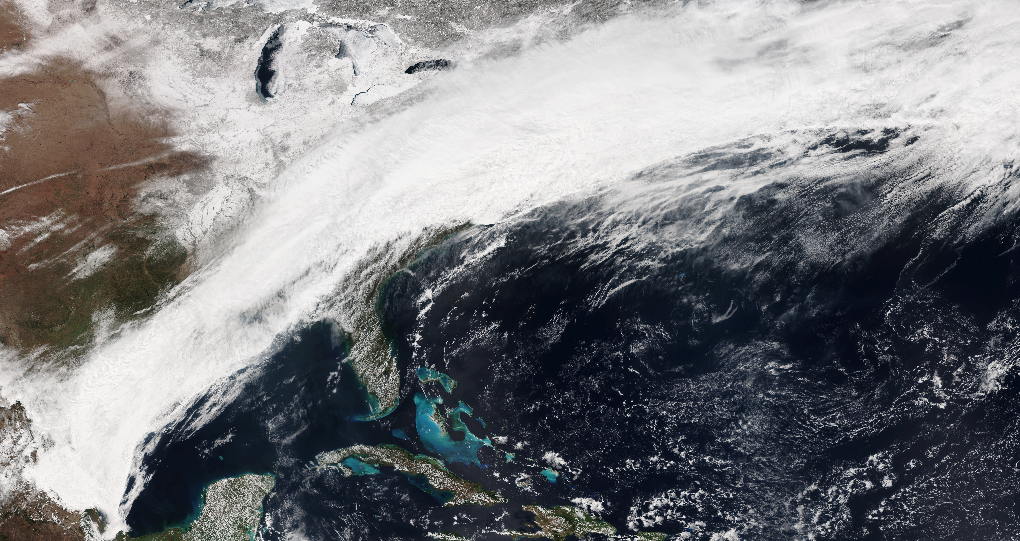
- The elongated winter storm moving over the East Coast early on March 5.

Meteorological history
- Formed: March 1, 2015
- Exited land: March 5, 2015
- Dissipated: March 7, 2015

Category 1 "Notable" winter storm
- Regional snowfall index: 1.37 (NOAA)
- Lowest pressure: 993 mbar (hPa); 29.32 inHg
- Lowest temperature: −16 °F (−27 °C) in Montpelier, Vermont on March 7
- Maximum snowfall or ice accretion: Snowfall – 54.6 in (139 cm) in Schofield Pass, Colorado; Ice – 0.25 in (6.4 mm) near Jackson, Mississippi

Overall effects
- Fatalities: None
- Injuries: 29 indirect
- Damage: Unknown
- Areas affected: Southwestern United States, High Plains, Upper Midwest, Southeastern United States, Northern Mexico, Northeastern United States
- Part of the 2014–15 North American winter

The March 2015 North American winter storm was a significant snow and ice storm that plowed through much of the United States, bringing 1–2 feet (12–24 in) of snow and record cold temperatures behind it. The storm actually occurred in two phases, with the latter bringing the cold temperatures behind it in its wake. Record cold temperatures even spread down to as far as northern Florida.

== Meteorological history ==
The first phase of the storm came on March 2, as a vigorous area of low pressure formed along an arctic cold front. Drawing some moisture from the so-called "Pineapple Express" from the Pacific, snowfall began to develop in the Upper Midwest, spreading a swath of accumulating snow ranging from 3–6 inches (7.6–15.2 cm) into March 3. Snow began to push into the Northeast by the evening, with generally light accumulations, before tapering off and changing to rain showers later that night. As the initial area of low pressure moved into the northeastern parts of Canada, its cold front lingered, stretching from Maine to western Texas. Because of the "Pineapple Express" pumping moisture into just about the same area where this arctic front was set up, snow began to break out as a plume of precipitation began to take shape by mid-day on March 4. This was the start of the final phase of the winter storm. An icing threat also loomed ahead as well, stretching into the southwestern part of the Mid-Atlantic. A new area of low pressure then formed near the Arkansas–Louisiana border and began to track eastward. Rain changed to moderate snowfall by 1 a.m EDT March 5, as cold air began to sink in. A long swath of snow then began to stretch from the southeastern tip of Massachusetts, into New York City, all the way down to the northern parts of Mississippi. Snow from this system was that of the dry, fluffy kind, which was one reason power outages weren't so severe in the Northeast, however there was more in the ice portion of the storm. The storm continued to dump snow, ice and sleet across the eastern half of the United States, before moving off the coast late on March 5, leaving snow accumulations of 6–12 inches (15–30 cm) into the Northeast, and record cold in its wake, with some areas, like Jackson, Mississippi, experiencing a near 50 °F (28 °C) drop in 24 hours as the arctic front moved through. Several daily, and monthly, record lows were set.

== Impact ==
=== Snowfall totals ===
The maximum snowfall total recorded during the storm was 54.6 inches (139 cm) in Schofield Pass, Colorado.

Maximum Snowfall by state
| State | Place(s) | Snowfall total | State | Place(s) | Snowfall total |
|---|---|---|---|---|---|
| Illinois | Brookport and Mound City | 11 inches (28 cm) | Pennsylvania | East Nantmeal | 11.3 inches (29 cm) |
| Indiana | Charlestown | 11 inches (28 cm) | Rhode Island | Saunderstown and South Kingstown | 12 inches (30 cm) |
| Iowa | Olin | 1.1 inches (2.8 cm) | Vermont | near Cabot | 3.5 inches (8.9 cm) |
| Kansas | Liberal | 3.5 inches (8.9 cm) | Virginia | Washington Dulles International Airport | 9.4 inches (24 cm) |
| Michigan | Newberry | 5.3 inches (13 cm) | West Virginia | Buckeye and Davis | 14 inches (36 cm) |
| Minnesota | Wrenshall | 6.5 inches (17 cm) | Arkansas | near Bono | 11 inches (28 cm) |
| Missouri | Kennett | 15.5 inches (39 cm) | Kentucky | near Radcliff | 25 inches (64 cm) |
| Nebraska | near Harrison | 6 inches (15 cm) | Mississippi | near Horn Lake | 4.4 inches (11 cm) |
| Ohio | near Waterloo | 17 inches (43 cm) | Oklahoma | New Cordell | 5 inches (13 cm) |
| South Dakota | near Porcupine | 5 inches (13 cm) | Tennessee | Martin | 13.5 inches (34 cm) |
| Wisconsin | Iron River | 6 inches (15 cm) | Texas | Grapevine | 7 inches (18 cm) |
| Connecticut | Ledyard | 9 inches (23 cm) | Arizona | near Parks | 12 inches (30 cm) |
| Maine | near Fort Kent | 7.5 inches (19 cm) | California | Squaw Valley | 32 inches (81 cm) |
| Maryland | Highfield | 15 inches (38 cm) | Colorado | Schofield Pass | 54.6 inches (139 cm) |
| Massachusetts | Dennisport | 12 inches (30 cm) | Nevada | Diamond Peak Ski Resort | 24 inches (61 cm) |
| New Hampshire | Pittsburg | 4 inches (10 cm) | New Mexico | Taos Ski Area | 21 inches (53 cm) |
| New Jersey | Scotch Plains and Roselle Park | 8.8 inches (22 cm) | Utah | Buckboard Flat | 49 inches (120 cm) |
| New York | Great Kills | 9.5 inches (24 cm) | Wyoming | Casper Mountain | 18 inches (46 cm) |

=== Travel ===
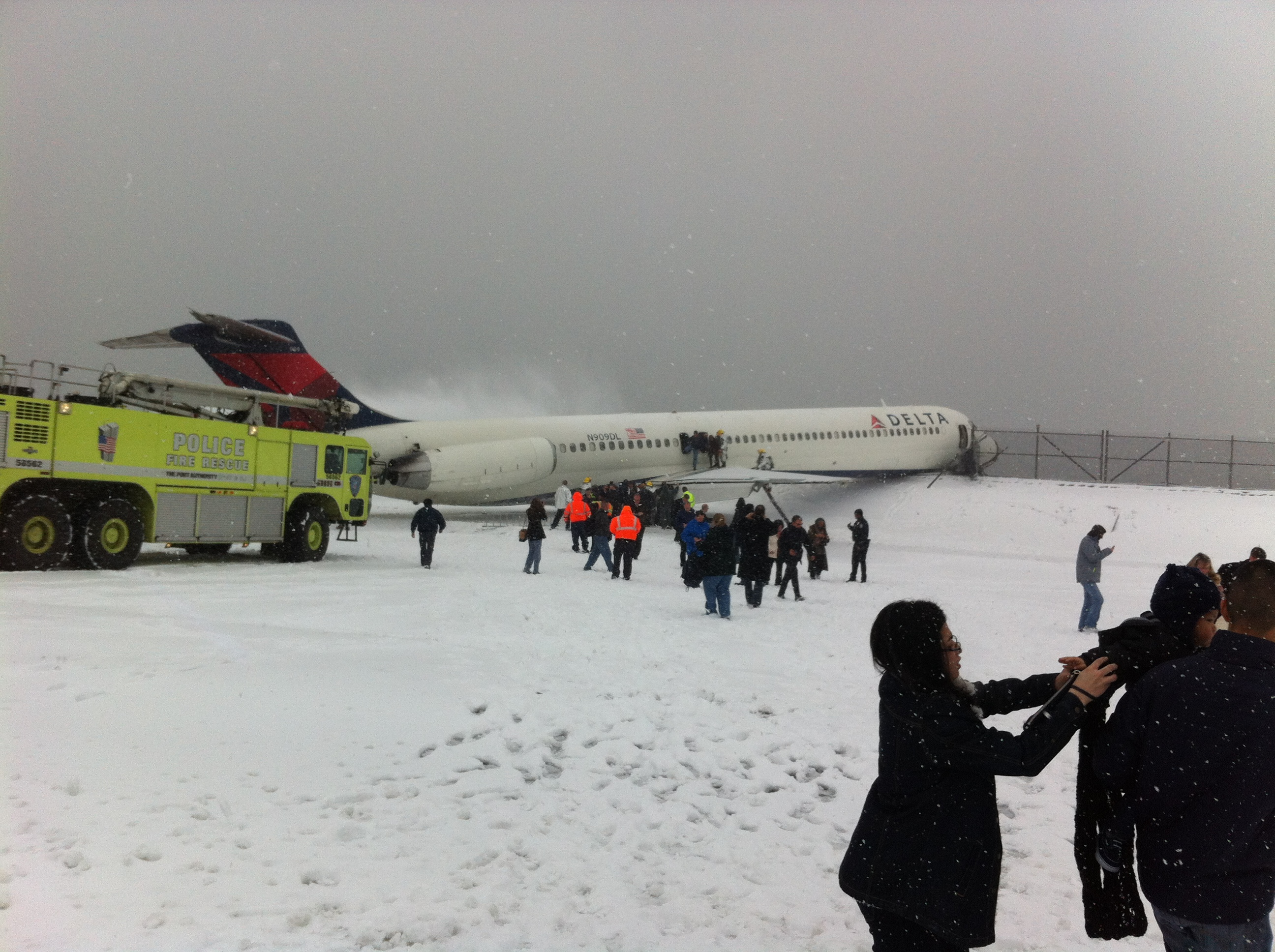
Delta Air Lines Flight 1086 hanging over Flushing Bay after losing control on a snowy runway

The winter storm snarled travel across many areas in the United States, including a massive pileup on Interstate 65 in Kentucky, in which some people were stranded on the highway for hours. Several other travel-related issues included a 14-car pileup on Interstate 459 in Alabama, and a jackknifed semi and flipped snow plow in Washington D.C. Over 4,000 flights were canceled due to the storm.

While landing at LaGuardia Airport, Delta Air Lines Flight 1086 lost control on a snowy runway attributed to the winter storm. Combined with excessive braking action, the aircraft lost control and veered off the side of the runway. Between 23 and 29 minor injuries were reported and the aircraft was subsequently written off. The winter storm produced 8.4 in (21 cm) of snow at the airport.

=== Closures ===
The ice caves at Apostle Islands National Lakeshore were temporarily closed due to the winter storm. Many schools, businesses, and local government offices in the Northeast and Southern United States were closed.

=== Cold snap ===
Multiple records for cold temperatures were set during and after the storm. Lexington, Kentucky got its heaviest two-day snowstorm. At least 26 daily record lows were set for cities across the lower 48 states, with six places being at or below 0 °F (−18 °C). Record low March temperatures were set in Pittsburgh (−5 °F (−21 °C)), Harrisburg (−1 °F (−18 °C)), Paducah, Kentucky (−6 °F (−21 °C) and Urbana, Illinois (−7 °F (−22 °C)).

== See also ==
- Weather of 2015
