= Emergency brake =

Emergency brake can refer to:

== Cars and motor vehicles ==
- Braking during an emergency.
- Autonomous emergency braking (AEB) in a collision avoidance system, which engages the main braking system in automobiles when a computer detects an imminent collision
- Advanced emergency braking system, where brakes are applied automatically in case of emergency
- Emergency brake assist (EBA or BA), which increases braking effectiveness when a human driver executes a panic stop
- Parking brake or hand brake in automobiles, which can also be used in case of failure of the main braking system

== Planes ==
- Autobrake, a system for automating braking during takeoff and landing of airplanes

== Trains ==
- Emergency brake (train), a term which can refer to a stronger-than-normal braking level, a separate backup braking system, or the lever used to engage the backup braking system
- Train protection system, which engages an emergency brake in dangerous situations
