= Automatic braking =

Automatic braking may refer to:

== Automobiles ==
- Autonomous emergency braking, known as AEB, is a collision avoidance system which engages the main braking system in automobiles when it detects an imminent collision
- Advanced emergency braking system, where brakes are applied automatically in case of emergency
- Emergency brake assist, known as EBA, which increases braking effectiveness when a human driver executes a panic stop
- Anti-lock braking system, which maximizes braking friction on slippery surfaces or during an emergency braking maneuver
- A feature of an autonomous cruise control system (ACC), when the vehicle ahead is too close
- Brake-by-wire

== Other vehicles ==
- Train protection system, which engages an emergency brake in dangerous situations
- Autobrake, a system for automating braking during takeoff and landing of airplanes
