= 79th Street Boat Basin =

Marina in Manhattan, New York

Coordinates: 40°47′10″N 73°59′07″W

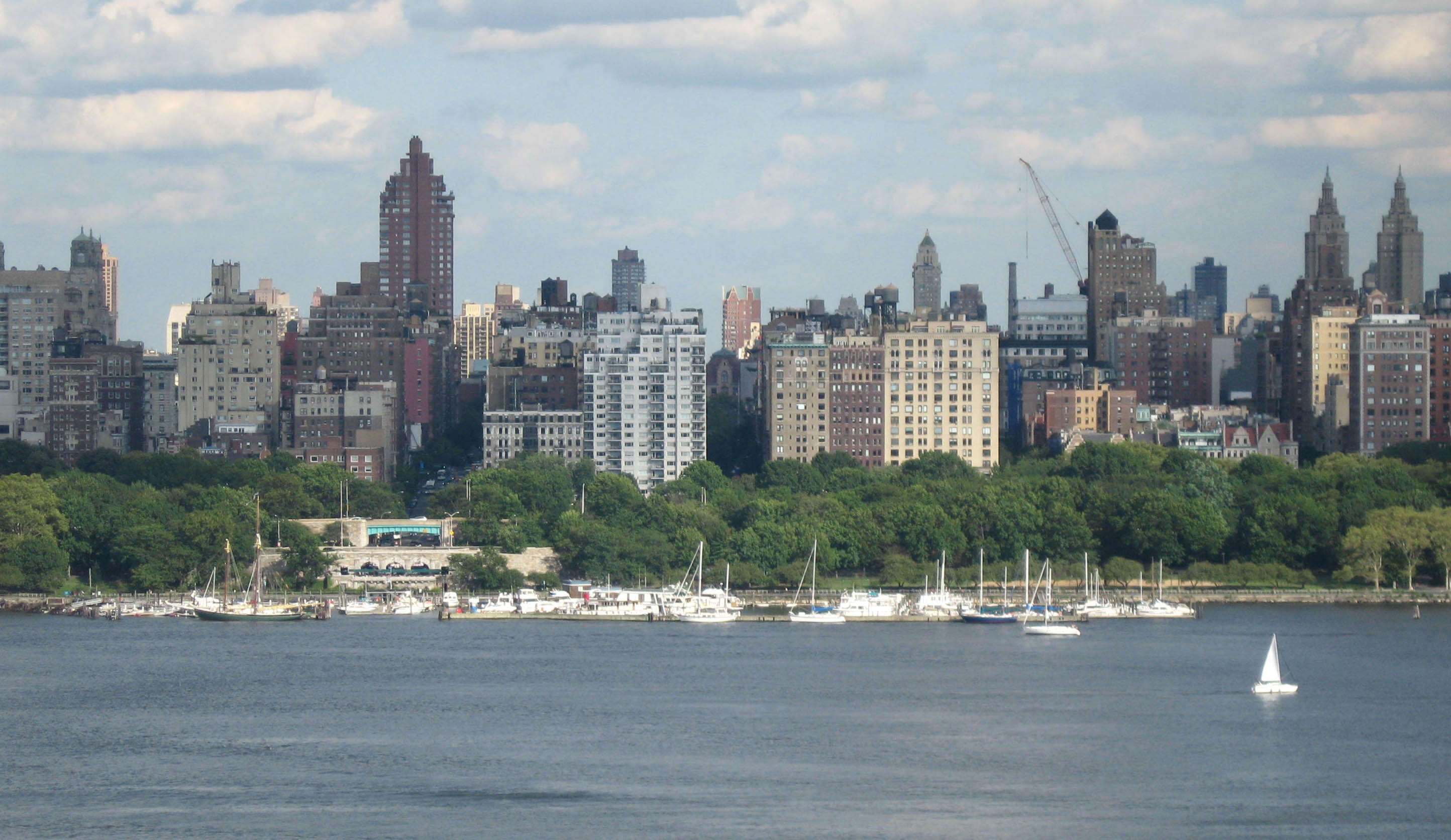
Boat Basin as seen from Guttenberg, New Jersey across the Hudson River

The 79th Street Boat Basin is a marina located in the Hudson River on the Upper West Side of Manhattan in New York City, within Riverside Park at the western end of 79th Street. Maintained and operated by the New York City Department of Parks and Recreation, it is the only facility in the city that allows year-round residency in boats, so it is a hub for houseboats in New York City. The marina closed for rebuilding in 2021 and is anticipated to reopen in 2028.

== History ==
=== Early history of the site ===
During the early years of New York City, the current site to Riverside Park was largely undeveloped, consisting of rocky outcroppings and steep bluffs along the Hudson River shoreline. Prior to European arrival, Native Americans sparsely populated this rough terrain. In 1846 the Hudson River Railroad laid tracks across the Hudson River shoreline to speed the transport of goods from Albany to Manhattan. In 1865, William R. Martin, a commissioner on the Board of Central Park proposed a scenic drive and park along the Hudson River. During the next two years New York City acquired land between the Hudson River Railroad and the bluffs along the shoreline, and in 1873 the New York City Park Board commissioned Riverside Park. The co-designer of Central Park, Frederick Law Olmsted, was named lead designer. His design, which was accepted in 1875, included a winding drive for horses and sight-seeing, as well as pedestrian walkways, both accessible from the neighborhoods to the east.

The park was completed by Olmsted's successor Calvert Vaux, but was soon surrounded by coal bins, shacks and garbage dumps.

=== Robert Moses era ===
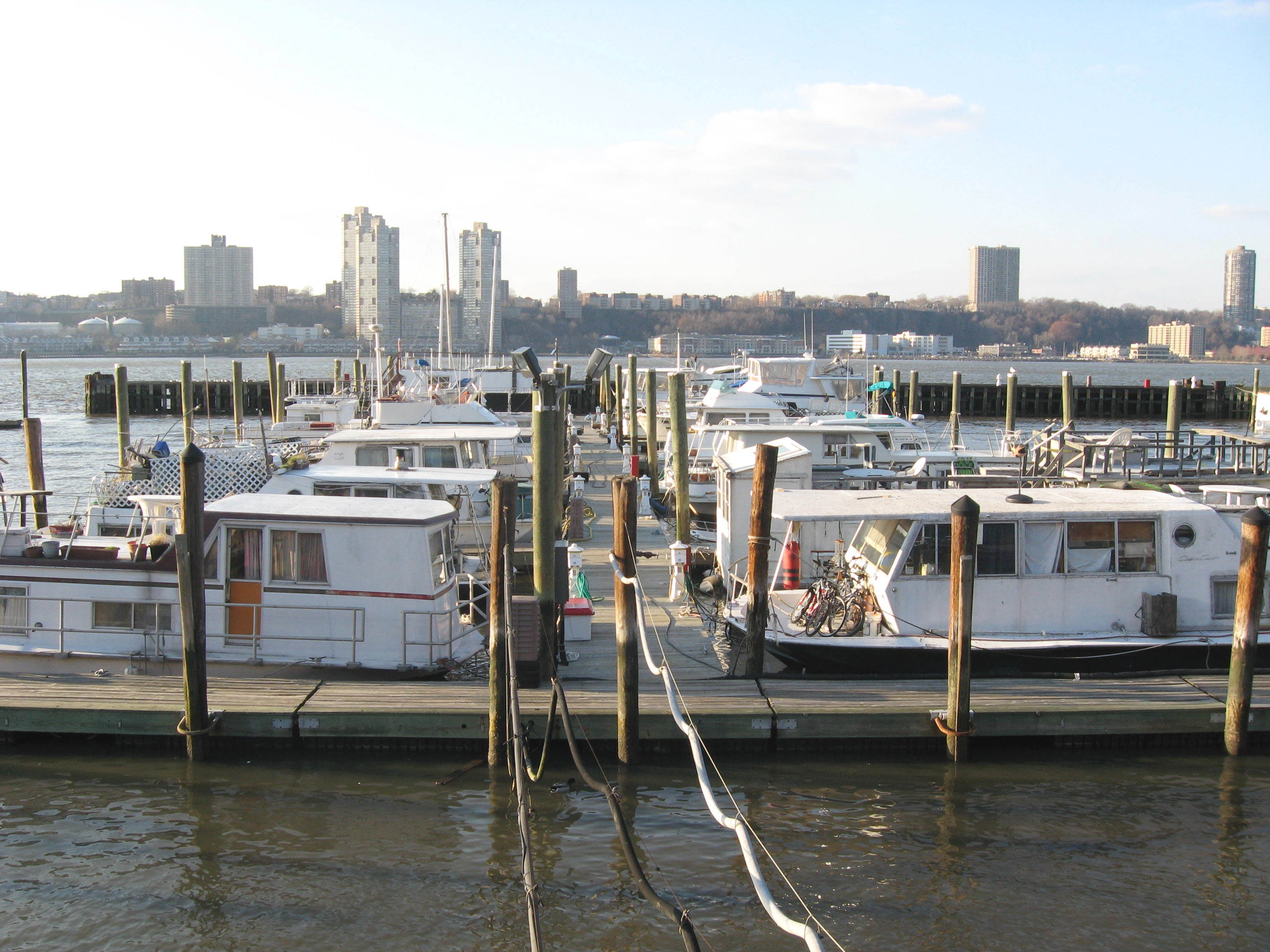
Seen from the Hudson River Greenway

By 1921, Riverside Park had deteriorated to an expanse of mud. Barbed-wire fences cut the citizens off from the waterfront. In the early 1920s, the architecture firm of McKim, Mead and White had submitted a proposal with an elevated traffic circle, covering the railroad tracks beneath. The traffic circle was partially built, and portions of a highway were also under construction on Manhattan's West Side. This drew the attention of citizens and politicians to this neglected area.

The City of New York announced the West Side Improvement Project in 1934. Robert Moses was at this time New York City's parks commissioner, and he took over the project. Moses expanded it into a grand architectural multi-level entry and exit from the Henry Hudson Parkway, all under the name of the "79th Street Grade Crossing Elimination Structure". The multi-level structure was designed by Gilmore David Clarke. Moses was able to raise $109 million to begin the project, for which the Works Projects Administration provided the equivalent of $114.2 million in 2025.

Moses hired the architect and engineer Clinton Lloyd to work on the structural elements with the landscape architect, Gilmore Clarke, to work on the landscape. The structure was built mostly from concrete, but the above-ground part is clad in cut stone. The initial McKim, Mead and White plan had called for rough-cut, dark stone to be applied to the exterior of the building, but Clinton Lyod modified their plan and used lighter, finer cut stone. The project created the Freedom Tunnel, an underground parking garage, a restaurant, and the marina. The rotunda was designed to hold the weight of the heavily used traffic circle that sits atop the building. The large support columns are visible inside the café.

The 79th Street Rotunda and Boat Basin and the rest of the West Side Improvement Project were finished in 1937.

=== Late 20th century ===
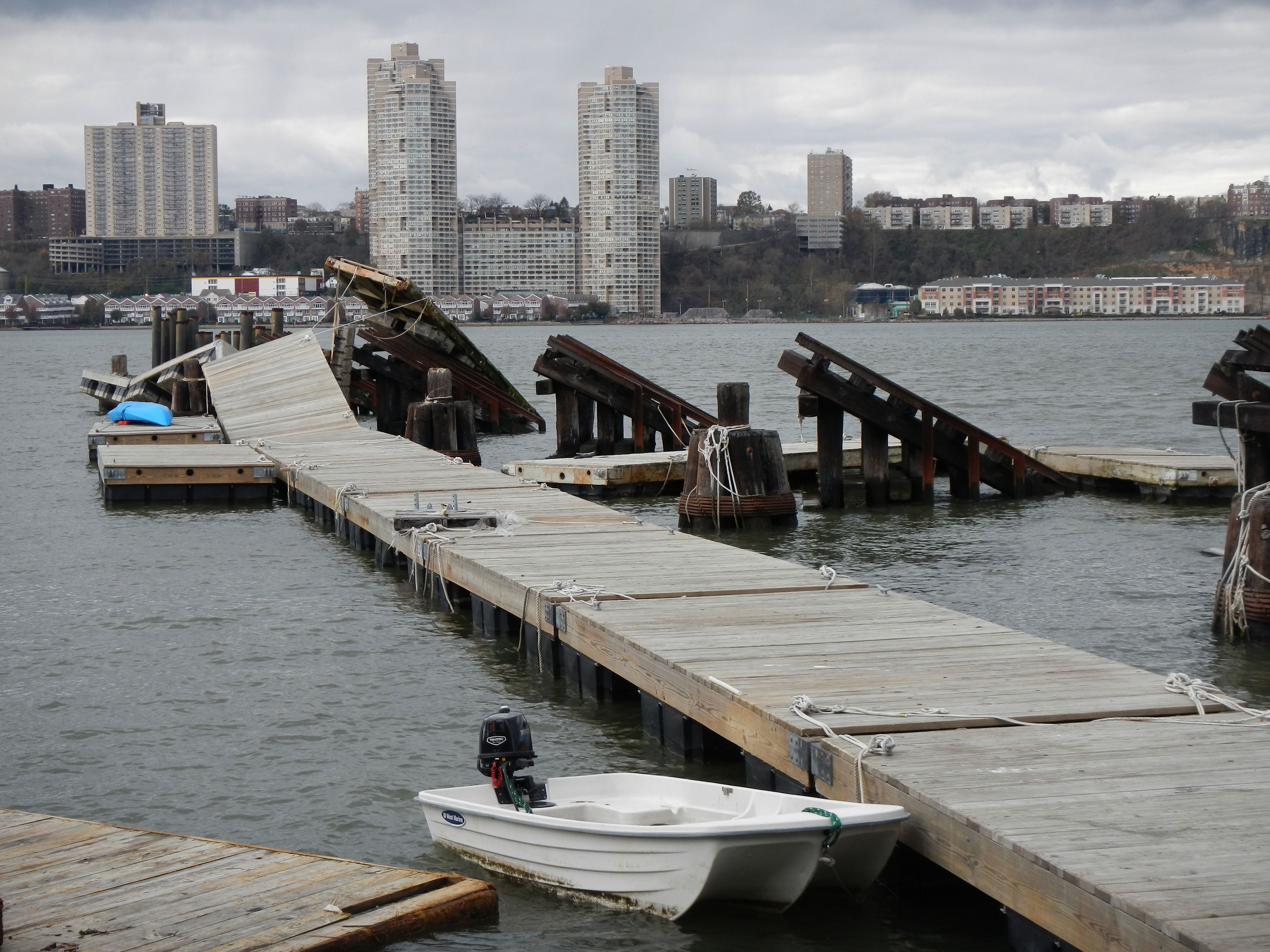
Damaged by Hurricane Sandy

By the 1960s, though the restaurant was long gone, the majority of slips were occupied by year-round boaters. Year-round residents have included Mad Magazine writer Dick DeBartolo, who uses a boat as his office. Mario Puzo and Frank Sinatra have all used the basin to moor their boats. In the 1960s, Roy Cohn docked his 95-foot (29 m) yacht at the basin and used it to entertain the city's political leaders.

In 1979, the city sought to cancel a 1977 concession agreement with Nichols Yacht Yards to operate the marina, claiming that Nichols had underreported revenue and had acted as an "absentee slumlord". Boat owners would manage the marina until a suitable operator would be found. Though Nichols obtained an injunction blocking the dismissal in December 1979, the firm's operation of the facility ended in 1982, with Nichols having spent $250,000 in legal fees to battle the city and counter a rent strike by boat owners.

In 1992, a five-year agreement was signed with boaters and the city, tying increases of nearly 25% in docking fees to improvements in facilities at the marina, such as new docks and electrical lines. By 1996, year-round residents had complained that the 18-month-long project, implemented at a cost of $1.4 million ($2.9 million today), had been done in shoddy fashion. The city stopped issuing new year-round permits in 1994, seeking to make space available for seasonal boaters among the basin's 116 slips. After complaints were received, the Parks Department agreed to an increase to 52 year-round spots, which start at a yearly fee of $5,000, based on the size of the boat.

=== 21st century ===
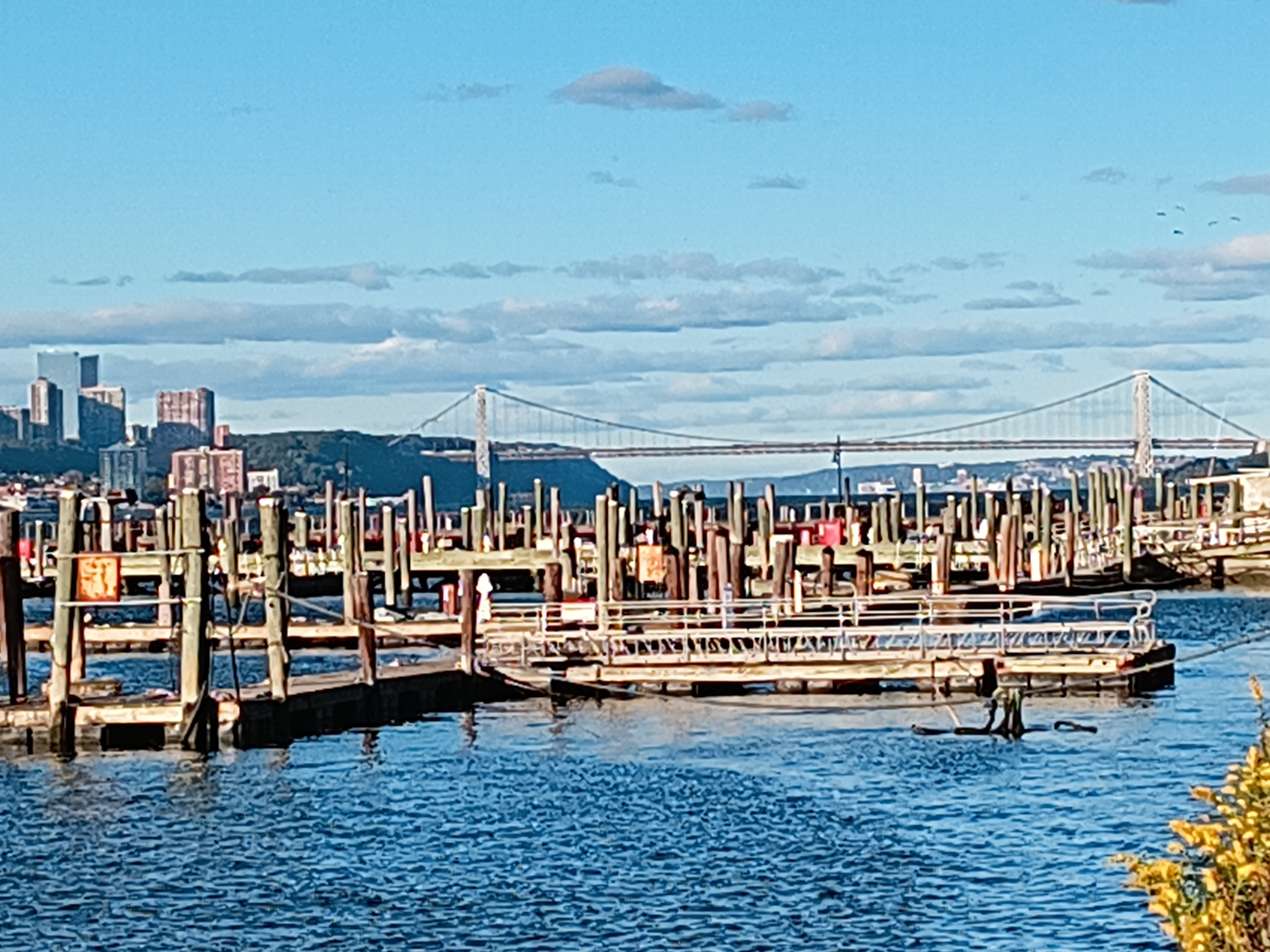
The 79th Street Boat Basin with no boats, October 2024

By May 2009, the department was to require that all boats be seaworthy. As of February 2008, there were 19 boats that were considered unseaworthy and that would need to make operational "in case of an emergency evacuation". By summer 2012, several boaters noticed that the basin was in a state of disrepair and asked the city to fix it.

In June 2021, mayor Bill de Blasio announced that the city would collaborate with FEMA to overhaul the marina and rotunda; all existing tenants were required to leave by November 1, 2021. At the time, the basin had not been dredged since 1958, and many of the marina's structures were dilapidated. Work was scheduled to begin in 2023 and cost $90 million. Manhattan Community Board 7 objected to the original design by Architecture Research Office (ARO), which called for a boxy 7,550-square-foot (701 m^{2}) boathouse structure. ARO subsequently modified the plans, drawing up blueprints for a 3,800-square-foot (350 m^{2}) structure on stilts, which Community Board 7 ultimately approved. Work on the new boathouse had still not started by July 2024. The New York City Public Design Commission approved ARO's blueprints in August 2025, allowing work to proceed.

== Services ==
The Boat Basin is also used as a launch site for kayaks, canoes and sailboats. The Hudson River sloop Clearwater often docks here, as part of its mission of informing the public about environmental and pollution issues in the Hudson River. As of May 2012, seasonal docking fees are $120 per linear foot (or a minimum of $3,000) for the summer (May 1 to October 31) and $105 per linear foot (or a minimum of $2,625) during the winter (November 1 to April 30). Total dock fee revenue was over $240,000 in 2007, with more revenue taken in from the higher fees paid for part-time boaters. As of February 2008, there was a waiting list of 450 boaters seeking part-time docking privileges during the summer. Fees were raised again in December 2011.

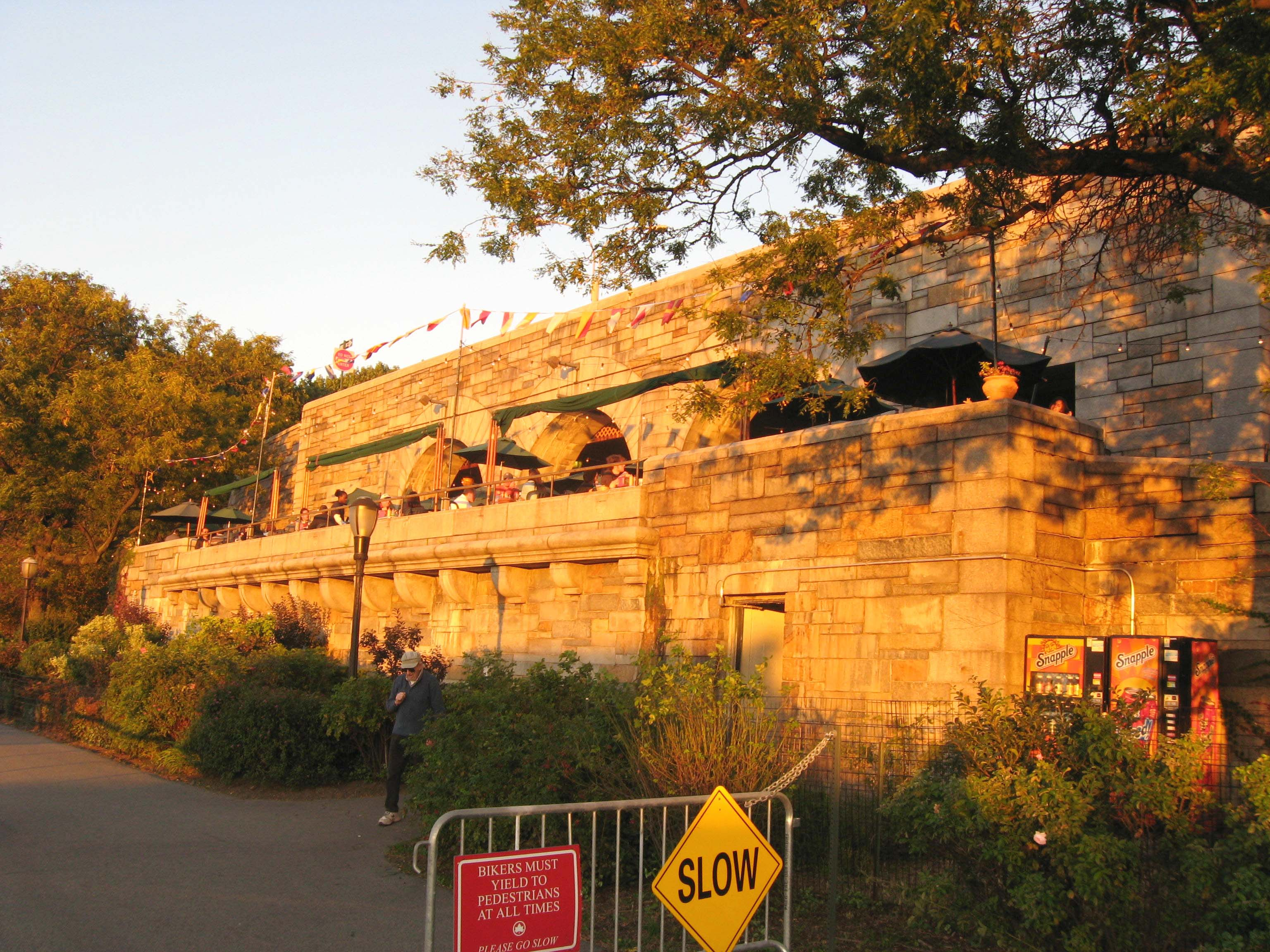
The Boat Basin Cafe inside the rotunda

A boat pump-out system connects directly to boats to allow for sewage disposal. Along with a fresh-water line system, the service is provided at no additional cost by the Parks Department. All other services, including electricity, telephone, television, and Internet access, must be paid for by boat owners, individually.

Rules and regulations covering the 79th Street Boat Basin also apply at the Sheepshead Bay Piers and the World's Fair Marina.

== 79th Street Rotunda ==
The 79th Street Rotunda, planned and built by former parks commissioner Robert Moses during the construction of the Henry Hudson Parkway is a roundabout that sits next to the boat basin. between the Hudson River and the parkway at the western edge of 79th Street. The rotunda was built to allow easy access and exit to and from the parkway. There are two ways to access the site by foot: one way is to walk along Riverside Park, and the other is to walk west on 79th Street. Drivers briefly drive atop the rotunda's roundabout as they exit the parkway or enter the parkway from 79th Street. The rotunda's interior, open-air courtyard is able to block noise and views of the parkway, while blocking noise and views of the highway for the park and boat marina below. Moses viewed the project with grand monumentality, while believing it would add to the grandeur and allure of New York City as viewed from across the Hudson River from New Jersey's Hudson River Palisades. The Rotunda was a core part of the project.

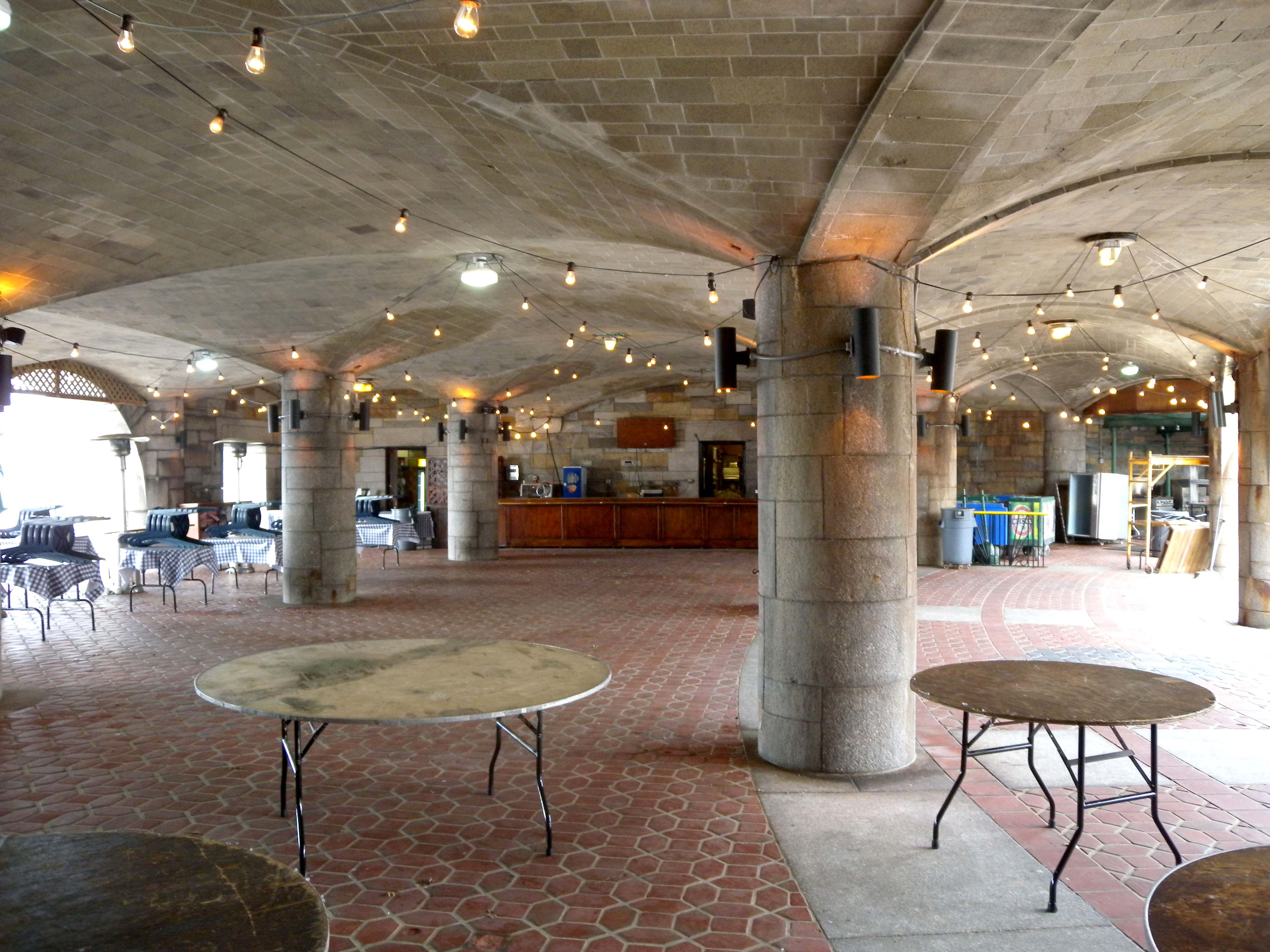
Inside the Boat Basin Cafe in the 79th Street Rotunda, showing Guastavino tile ceiling

The structure is constructed primarily out of concrete. Above ground, the concrete is clad in cut stone to give the structure a smoothened-out look. Below ground in the parking garage, however, the concrete is more roughened. The rotunda was built to serve the double purpose of a transportation corridor and a recreational area; the two uses are visually separated into two vertical levels. The 79th Street Rotunda allows easy access and exit to and from the Henry Hudson Highway. It allows trains on the West Side Line to travel into Manhattan via a tunnel called the Freedom Tunnel. It provides an internal, sheltered parking garage for boat basin users.

The granite and fieldstone open rotunda surrounded by a vaulted Guastavino tiled arcade overlooks the marina. In the 1970s, the rotunda was available to reserve for private parties through the city's Concessions Department for a $250 fee in addition to a cleaning deposit. It was later the site of the open-air Boat Basin Cafe from 1997 to 2019. The internal courtyard and seasonal café were added after the fact of initial design and conception.

As well as ongoing uses, the rotunda hosted occasional theatrical performances and art exhibits and has previously provided shelter at night for the homeless. Incidentally, the garage in the Boat Basin contained a secret trove of documents related to Robert Moses' tenure as parks commissioner. Journalist Robert Caro relied on these forgotten documents—memos, orders, directives, and carbon copies of communiqués—as the backbone of his Pulitzer Prize-winning book about Moses, The Power Broker.

== Filming location ==
The Boat Basin has been a popular filming location. The Parks Department's web page for the basin lists details for obtaining film permits among things to do at the marina. The 1986 film 9½ Weeks, starring Kim Basinger and Mickey Rourke, includes scenes shot at the marina and inside a houseboat moored there. The 1998 film You've Got Mail has Tom Hanks and his relatives living on yachts in the basin.
