= Flushing Bay =

Bay in Queens, New York

Coordinates: 40°46′44″N 73°51′24″W

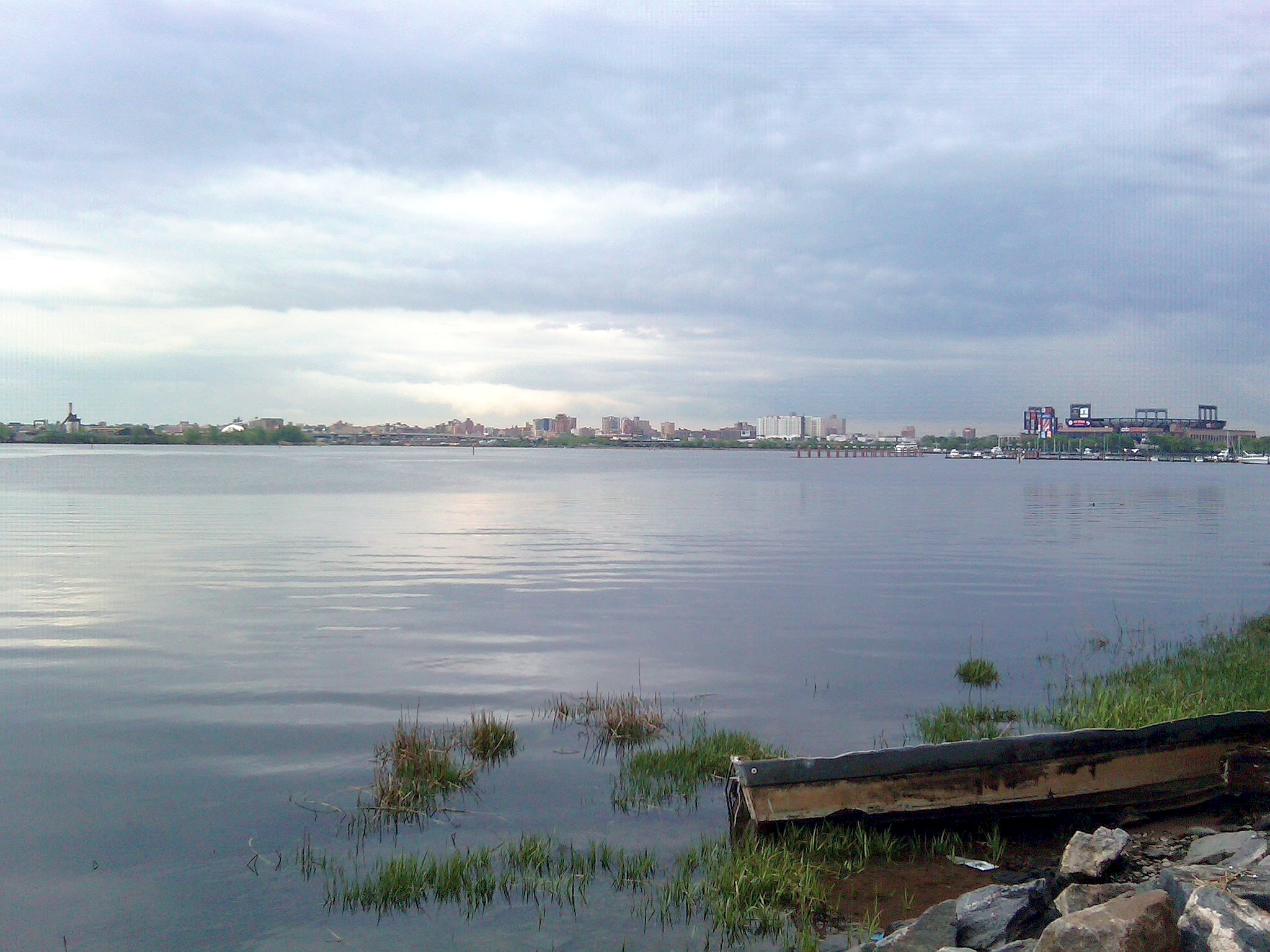
Looking east at Flushing Bay from the promenade near LaGuardia Airport.

Flushing Bay is a tidal embayment in New York City. It is located on the south side of the East River and stretches to the south near the neighborhood of Flushing, Queens. It is bordered on the west by LaGuardia Airport and the Grand Central Parkway, on the south by Northern Boulevard, and on the east by the neighborhood of College Point. The Flushing River empties into the bay at its southeast corner. A 150-foot-wide navigational channel (46 m) dredged at a depth of 14 feet (4.3 m) runs along much of the bay's length.

== History ==
Flushing Bay was an important source of food for the Matinecock tribe of Native Americans and early European settlers, providing fish, shellfish, and waterfowl. After the American Civil War, the area surrounding the bay became waterfront resort for the wealthy. The World's Fair Marina, constructed for the 1964 New York World's Fair, is located on the southern end of the bay beside the East Elmhurst neighborhood. The marina is part of Flushing Meadows–Corona Park and it is bordered by the 1.4-mile-long (2.3 km) Flushing Bay Promenade.

On September 21, 1776, the Colonial patriot Nathan Hale was captured by the British Army near a tavern at Flushing Bay after being fingered as a spy. He was hanged the next day on Manhattan Island.

The Williamsburgh Yacht Club is located on the east side of Flushing Bay in College Point. It was established in Brooklyn in 1865, but then the yacht club moved to North Beach (now part of the LaGuardia Airport) in 1896.

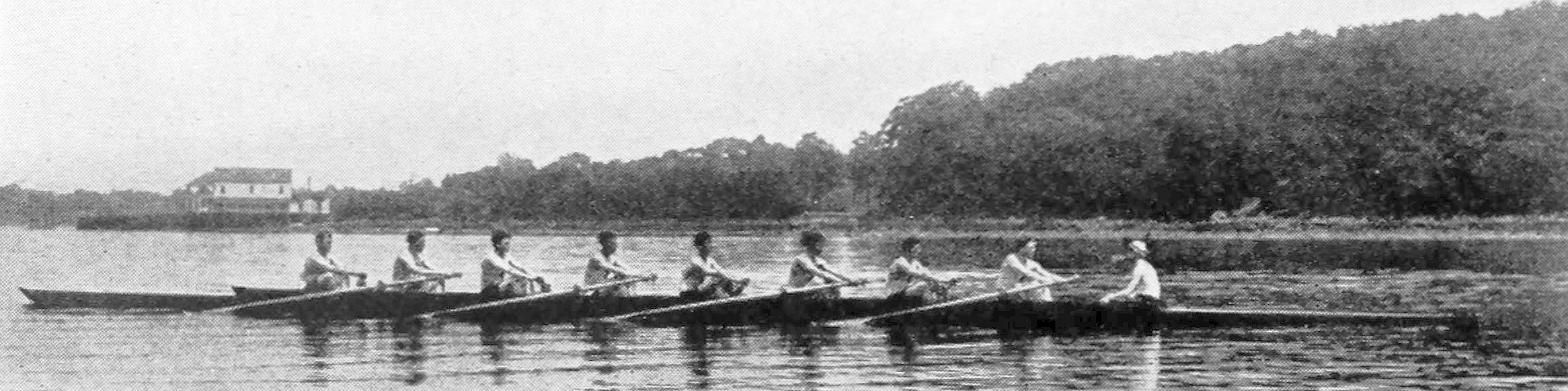
Wahnetah Boat Club training on Flushing Bay, 1917.

The New York City Department of Sanitation's North Shore Marine Transfer Station is located in College Point on the eastern shore of Flushing Bay. From 1954 to 2001, this site was used to transfer garbage from trucks to barges. A new transfer station at the site opened in 2015.

=== Incidents ===
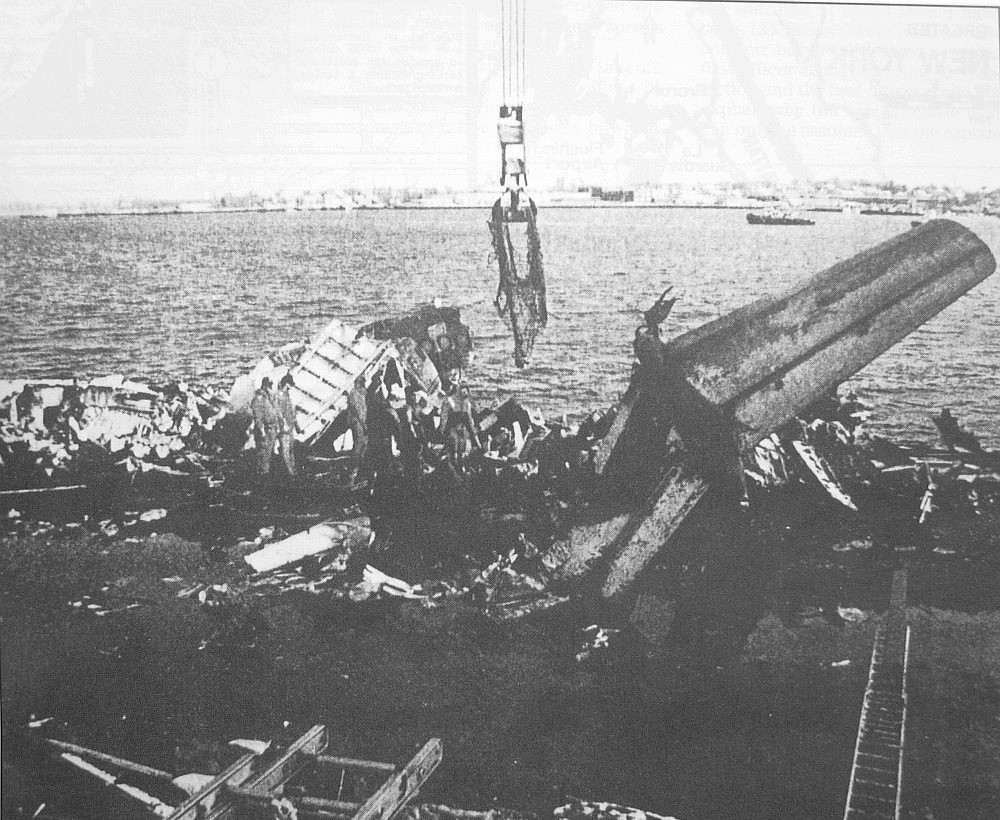
Wreckage of USAir Flight 405 lies in the bay on March 22, 1992.

On March 22, 1992, USAir Flight 405 crashed in the bay shortly after takeoff, and 27 out of the 51 people on board were killed.

On March 5, 2015, Delta Air Lines Flight 1086 skidded off the runway at LaGuardia Airport and stopped a few feet away from Flushing Bay. 24 people were injured and the aircraft was damaged.

== Proximity to LaGuardia Airport ==
The present shoreline of Flushing Bay has been largely altered by the development of LaGuardia Airport. Before the airport opened in December 1939, millions of cubic yards of landfill were added to the western shoreline of the bay to create space for runways. In 1966, the Port Authority extended the northern end of Runway 4 (or 22) by 2,000 feet (610 m) and the western end of Runway 13 (or 31) by 1,500 feet (460 m) by constructing a 50-acre (20 ha), pile-supported concrete deck over parts of Flushing Bay, including the Rikers Island Channel. In the 1990s, about 20 acres (8 ha) of Flushing Bay were filled in to create an overrun at the eastern end of Runway 13 (or 31). To offset the loss of wetlands, new wetlands were constructed adjacent to the airport in Flushing Bay and in Little Neck Bay.

Concerns have arisen given the proximity to a flight path into LaGuardia Airport, although the government of New York City has stated that the design includes adequate safeguards to prevent the facility from attracting flocks of birds that might be harmful to airliners.

== Pollution ==
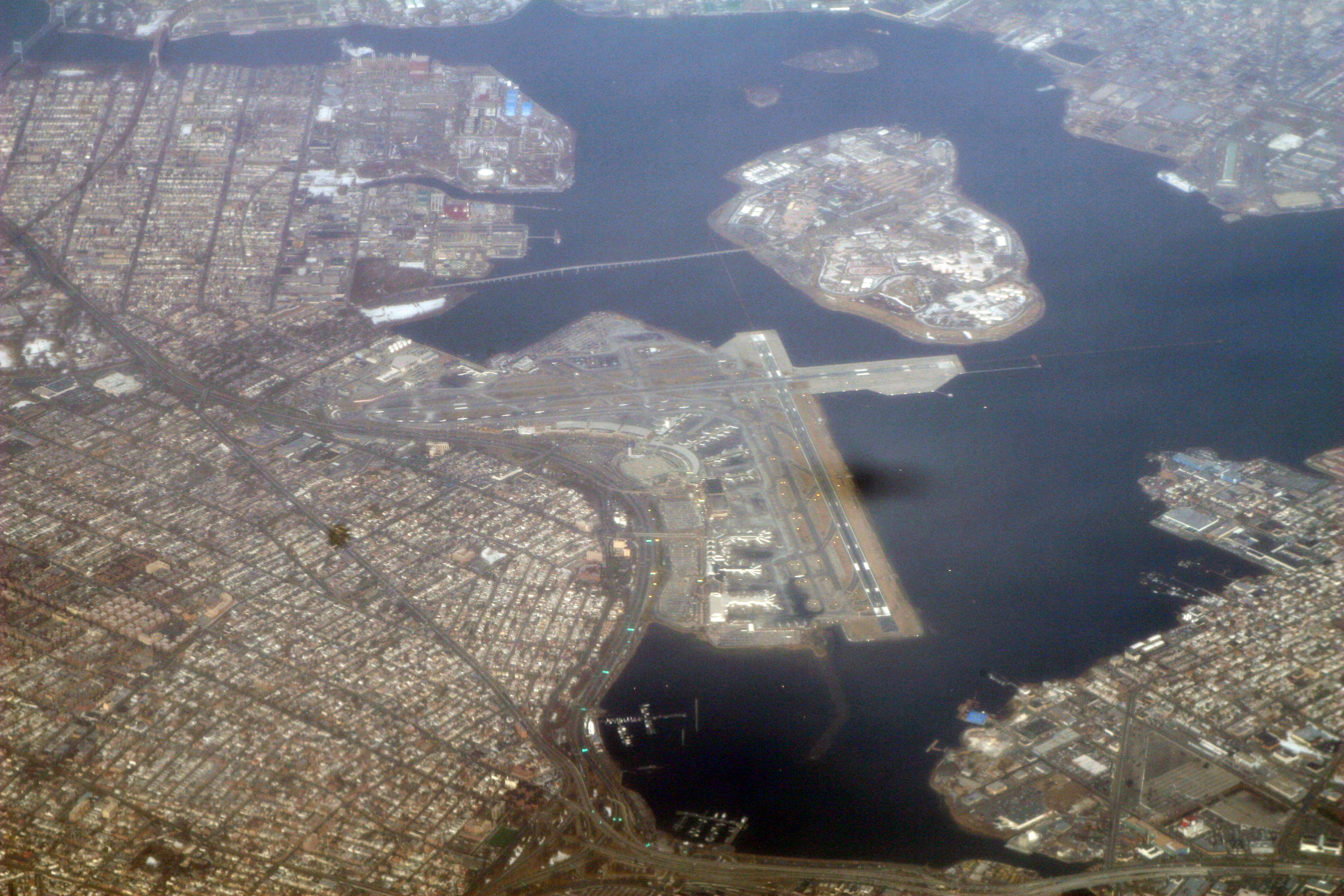
The Bowery Bay Wastewater Treatment Plant is seen along the Queens shoreline just above the Rikers Island Bridge.

In 1964, a 2,800 ft-long (850 m) dike, commonly known as "the Finger", was built to protect boats docked at the World's Fair Marina from strong waves. Protruding from LaGuardia Airport, the dike is often cited as the cause for the bad smell that emanates from the bay, especially in the summertime. Flushing Bay and Flushing River have a long history of being used as dumping areas for sewage discharges and industrial waste. While this pollution is a problem in itself, the dike prevents the water in the bay from circulating naturally. Plans to increase circulation have included slicing a waterway through the dike; however, dredging of the bay floor has been the most frequent proposal.

Plans for a 1.7-mile (2.7 km) promenade on Flushing Bay were approved by Queens Community Board 7 in 1987, but were delayed due to a lack of funds. In 1994, a Key House Appropriations subcommittee authorized the money for the U.S. Army Corps of Engineers (USACE) to study dredging the Flushing Bay near where the dike was built. The measure of this plan was drafted by Rep. Thomas J. Manton and was aided by Rep. Nita Lowey. The Port Authority of New York and New Jersey sought final approval during the summer of that year from the City Council to build the $41-million safety overrun on a 20-acre (8.1 ha) landfill. The USACE subsequently allocated $2.7 million toward a feasibility study for a cleanup. In 1999, the Parks Department negotiated a deal with the New York City Department of Environmental Protection. This plan was also to build a 28.5-million-gallon sewer overflow tank under the river to relieve flooding in the area. A redesigned, refurbished Flushing Bay promenade began that May. Though the promenade was reopened in 2001, its "rotten egg" smell remained.

Following repeated complaints about Flushing Bay's "rotten egg smell", a $47 million cleanup of the bay was announced in 2015. As part of the cleanup, a $15.4 million dredging project near the World's Fair Marina was undertaken in 2017. Also during the cleanup, old pilings were removed and replaced with wetlands, a project completed in mid-2018. The city also rebuilt sewer lines leading to the Bowery Bay Wastewater Treatment Plant in nearby Bowery Bay, reducing Flushing Bay's combined sewer overflows by about 225,000,000 US gal (850,000,000 L) per year.
