= Bowery Bay =

Bay in Queens, New York

Coordinates: 40°46′42″N 73°53′17″W

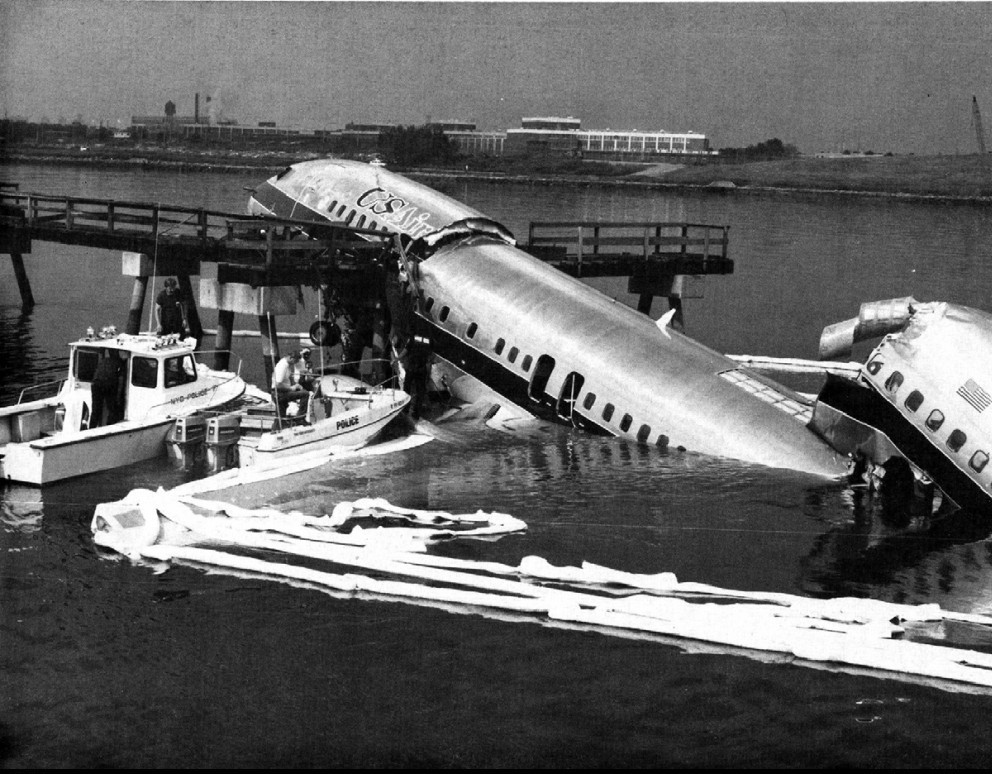
Bowery Bay seen in 1989, with the wreckage of USAir Flight 5050 in the foreground.

Bowery Bay is a bay off the East River in New York City. It is located near the Ditmars Steinway area in the neighborhood of Astoria in the New York City borough of Queens. It is bordered on the west by the Bowery Bay Water Pollution Control Plant and on the south and east by LaGuardia Airport.

Before the construction of LaGuardia Airport in the late 1920s, the shoreline of Bowery Bay and Flushing Bay, originally called Bowery Bay Beach and later North Beach, was a popular seaside resort. North Beach was the site of a popular amusement park from 1895 to 1915 and was known as "the Coney Island of Queens".

The Marine Air Terminal at LaGuardia Airport was originally constructed along the south end of Bowery Bay to accommodate flying boats. From 1940 until 1945, 'Clippers' operated by Pan American Airways provided trans-Atlantic flights from Bowery Bay to Europe. The eastern edge of Bowery Bay is currently bordered by LaGuardia Airport's general aviation terminal.

The western edge of Bowery Bay is the site of the Bowery Bay Water Pollution Control Plant, a wastewater treatment plant operated by the New York City Department of Environmental Protection. The plant opened in 1939 and is capable of treating 150 million US gallons (570,000 m^{3}) of sewage per day from northwestern Queens. Luyster Creek, a subterranean river, empties into Bowery Bay near the water plant.

The Rikers Island Bridge spans the northern portion of Bowery Bay.
