= USAir Flight 5050 =

1989 aviation accident in New York

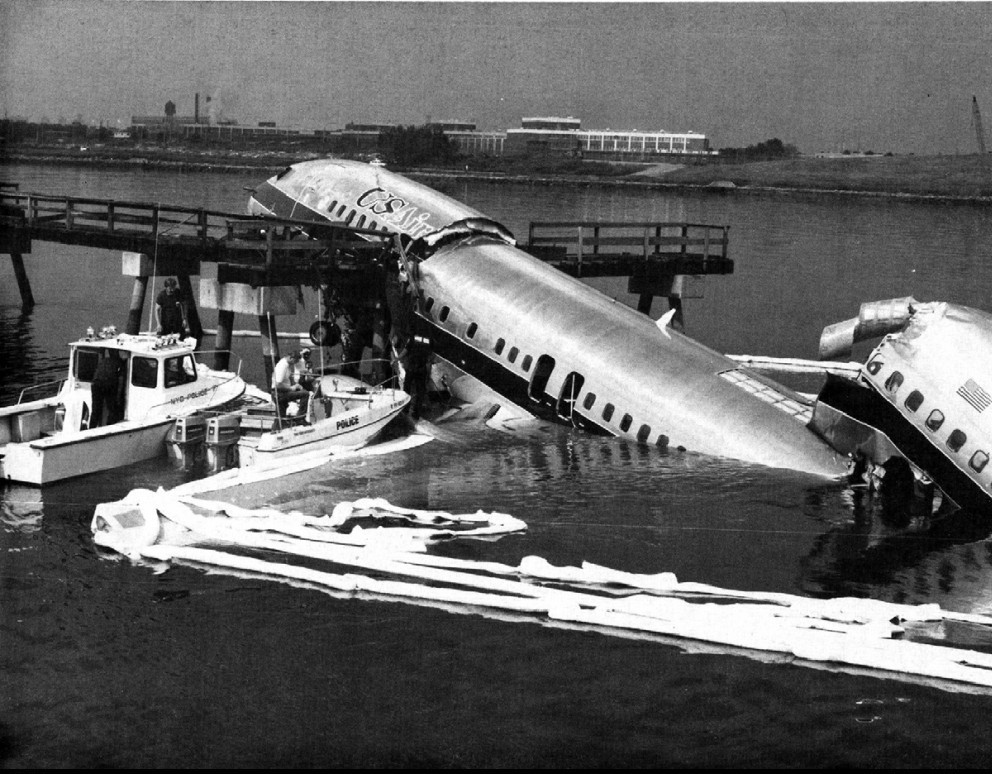
- Wreckage of the aircraft in the Bowery Bay

Accident
- Date: September 20, 1989
- Summary: Pilot error, rejected takeoff leading to runway excursion
- Site: Bowery Bay near LaGuardia Airport, New York, United States; 40.776°N 73.885°W

Aircraft
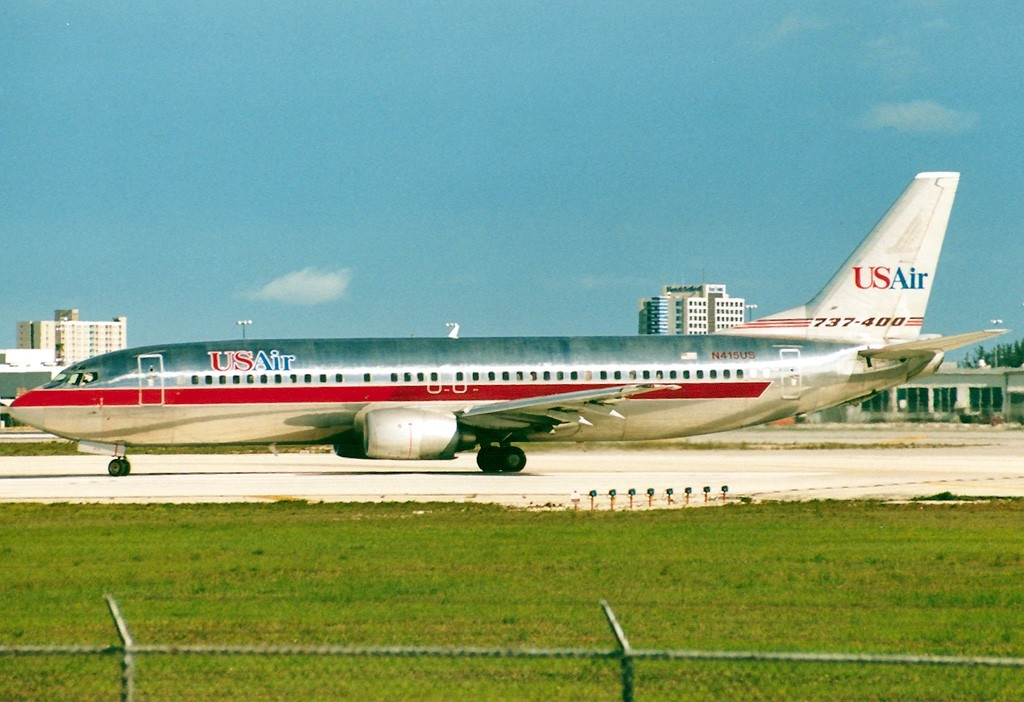
- A USAir Boeing 737-400, similar to the one involved in the accident
- Aircraft type: Boeing 737-400
- Operator: USAir
- IATA flight No.: US5050
- ICAO flight No.: USA5050
- Call sign: US AIR 5050
- Registration: N416US
- Flight origin: LaGuardia Airport
- Destination: Charlotte/Douglas International Airport
- Occupants: 63
- Passengers: 57
- Crew: 6
- Fatalities: 2
- Injuries: 21
- Survivors: 61

USAir Flight 5050 was a passenger flight that crashed on takeoff from LaGuardia Airport in Queens, New York. As the Boeing 737-400 took off from LaGuardia's runway 31, the plane drifted to the left. After hearing a loud bang, the pilots attempted to reject the takeoff, but were unable to stop the plane short of the end of the runway. The plane continued past the end of the runway and plunged into Bowery Bay. Two passengers were killed.

== Background ==
On September 20, 1989, Flight 5050 was an unscheduled flight operated by USAir to replace the regularly scheduled but cancelled Flight 1846, from LaGuardia Airport to Charlotte Douglas International Airport in North Carolina. The flight was operated using a Boeing 737-400 narrow-body jet airliner (registration number N416US). The aircraft was originally delivered to Piedmont Airlines on December 23, 1988, and was inherited by USAir when it acquired Piedmont in 1989. On the date of the accident, the aircraft had accrued 2,235 flight hours, and was painted in a Piedmont-USAir transition livery.

== Flight crew ==
Flight 5050's captain was Michael Martin, 36, who began his career as a C-130 pilot for the United States Air Force; Martin continued to hold the rank of Major in the Air Force Reserve at the time of the accident. Martin was hired by USAir subsidiary Piedmont Airlines in 1984 and worked as a Boeing 727 flight engineer for a year before transitioning to the Boeing 737. Martin's training as airline captain was interrupted twice, once due to a USAF Reserve deployment and once due to personal illness. Martin had accumulated a total of 2,625 flight hours in the Boeing 737, including 140 hours as a Boeing 737-400 captain.

Constantine Kleissas, 29, who served as Flight 5050's first officer, had been hired by Piedmont three months before the accident. Flight 5050 was his first takeoff in a 737 without supervision by a flight instructor.

Neither pilot had formal training in cockpit resource management. The captain did not discuss emergency procedures such as rejected takeoffs with the first officer before the departure, despite the presence of weather conditions that included darkness, low visibility, and a wet runway.

== Accident sequence ==
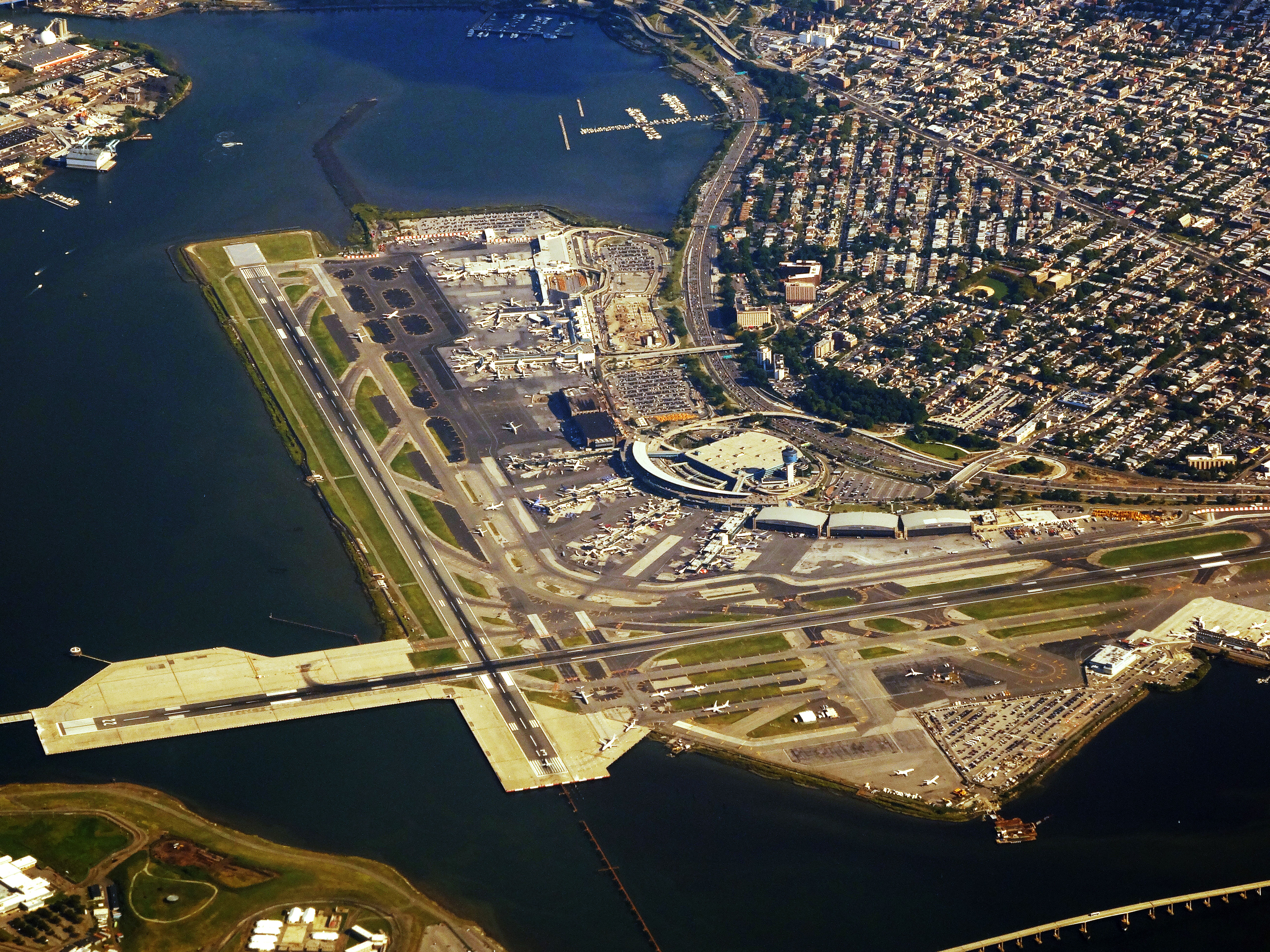
LaGuardia Airport, looking south. The airplane overran runway 31 and entered Bowery Bay, seen at the bottom of the photo.

Flight 5050 was cleared for a departure from LaGuardia Airport's runway 31, a 7,000-foot (2,100 m) runway which ends with an elevated deck overhanging Bowery Bay.

As the first officer began the takeoff on runway 31, the airplane started to drift to the left. The captain attempted to correct that drift with the use of the nosewheel tiller. Moments later, they heard a "bang" and then a rumbling noise. The bang was most likely due to air escaping from the left nose tire as it was pulled off its wheel, damaged by the captain's improper use of the nosewheel steering tiller. The captain took over control from the first officer and aborted the takeoff, but he was unable to stop the plane before it ran off the end of the runway into Bowery Bay.

The airplane collided with a wooden approach lighting stanchion as it went off the end of the overrun. The fuselage broke into three sections, with the forward section resting on part of the elevated light stanchion and the aft section partially submerged. All of the fuselage fractures were due to overstress.

=== Evacuation ===
All the exits except the L1 door and L2 door were used for evacuation. Senior flight attendant Wayne Reed could not open the L1 door. The L2 door was opened and then closed by Kelly Donovan when water entered the cabin. Flight attendant Susan Harelson deployed the evacuation slide at R1; the R2 slide was disarmed before the door was opened because flight attendant Jolynn Galmish believed that the slide would float upward and block the exit. All four of the overwing exits were used to evacuate successfully.

"About 20 passengers stood on the left wing, which was out of the water. Someone unstowed the fabric ditching line from above a left overwing exit and tied it to its wing fitting. These 20 passengers, including the woman with the 5 year old child and the 8-month old infant, held onto the line as they awaited rescue. The ditching line was unstowed from its right overwing exit opening but evacuees did not know it needed to be tied to the right wing fitting. The forward portion of the right wing was out of the water and passengers held onto the ditching line so they could stay out of the water."

"Passengers who egressed at the two floor-level exits entered the water and because of the one-knot current some persons drifted away from the airplane and under the runway deck. Crewmembers threw flotation seat cushions and crew life preservers, which were held by passengers and crewmembers, some of whom could not swim. Several persons complained that they could not hold onto the cushions or that the cushions did not keep them afloat. Some clung to pilings under the deck and floating debris. Some passengers also swallowed fuel that was on the water surface. Several complained that waves from boats and downwash from a rescue helicopter hampered staying afloat with their heads out of the water. One passenger said that she sustained a fractured right ankle and a lacerated hand when a rescue boat backed over her."

The last passengers, who were trapped in seats 21F and 22A, were extricated approximately 90 minutes after the accident.

Two of the 57 passengers were killed. Fifteen other passengers were injured, one critically.

== Accident analysis ==
The NTSB found numerous "crew coordination problems" during its investigation, which had a bearing on the ultimate outcome of Flight 5050:

- The captain's failure to provide an extended briefing, or an emergency briefing, before the takeoffs at BWI and LGA or at any time during the 9 hours the crewmembers spent together before the accident.
- The decision of the captain to execute the takeoff at LGA with autobrakes disengaged, on a wet and short runway, contrary to company and manufacturer recommendations.
- The failure of the crew to detect the improper rudder trim setting in response to the checklists.
- The failure of the crew to detect the improper rudder trim setting by means of rudder pedal displacement, information during taxiing and holding for takeoff.
- The failure of the aircraft to hold at taxiway GOLF GOLF during taxiing as directed by ATC (this error, although an obvious violation, had no effect on the accident sequence).
- The failure of the first officer to push the correct button to engage the autothrottles at the beginning of the takeoff roll. He then manually advanced the throttles; the resultant delay and the slightly low thrust set on the left engine lengthened the airplane's ground roll and added to the directional control problem.
- The failure of the captain, during the takeoff roll, to take control of the aircraft and transfer control back to the first officer in a smooth and professional manner, with the result of confusion as to who was in control. Because of poor communication between the pilots, both attempted to 'maintain directional control initially and neither was fully in control later in the takeoff, compounding directional control difficulties.
- The failure of the captain to make speed call outs and to consult airspeed before initiating an abort. Computed V1 speed was 125 knots (144 mph; 232 km/h) and action by the captain to reject the takeoff began at 130 knots (150 mph; 240 km/h).
- The failure of the captain to announce the abort decision in standard terminology, with the result of confusion by the first officer as to what action was being taken.
- The failure of the captain to execute the abort procedure in a rapid and aggressive manner. After initiating the RTO, the captain used differential braking to steer the airplane. This delayed the attainment of effective braking until 5½ seconds after the takeoff was rejected. Braking during the RTO was less than the maximum braking achievable on the wet runway; the airplane could have been stopped on the runway.

=== Rudder trim issue ===
Analysis of the digital flight data recorder revealed that the rudder trim had moved to the far left limit, while the plane was parked at the gate. Since power to the DFDR was off, while parked at the gate, the NTSB could not determine what caused the rudder trim to move to that extreme limit. It was speculated that someone was sitting in the jumpseat (which is located directly behind the control pedestal) had rested their feet on it and inadvertently toggled the trim knob. This knob used to have a raised flat and straight portion protruding from it. Subsequent to this event, all 737s were retrofitted with a rounded rudder trim knob – and a higher ridge around the aft section of the pedestal in an effort to prevent a similar occurrence. That mistrim of the rudder should have been discovered when the Before Takeoff checklist was read, but the pilots failed to ensure the rudder was in the zero trim (neutral) position at that time. The captain also failed to detect that the rudder pedals were unequally displaced by 4.25 inches (108 mm) and the nosewheel steering was turned to 4 degrees left, during the taxi out from the gate to the takeoff position on the runway.

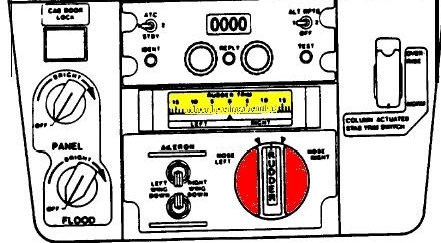
Rudder trim control (in red) and rudder trim position indicator (in yellow), on the rear of the center console, between the pilot seats of the B737-400. Note that the indicator needle is in the center of the gauge—the required position when pilots finish running the pre-start and pre-takeoff checklists

When the rudder trim is centered to zero degrees, as required for takeoff, the rudder pedals would be matched so that the captain's legs would be extended the same amount, for each pedal, and the plane's nosewheel steering would not keep trying to turn the plane to the left, during taxi operations (See graphic).

The NTSB could not understand why the captain failed to detect the mistrimmed rudder (as evidenced by the abnormal displacement of the rudder pedals and the tendency for the plane to keep trying to turn left), during the time that the plane was taxied to the takeoff position.

The safety issues discussed in the report are the design and location of the rudder trim control on the Boeing 737-400, air crew coordination and communication during takeoffs, crew pairing, and crash survivability. Safety Recommendations addressing these issues were made to the Federal Aviation Administration and the Port Authority of New York and New Jersey.

== Testing of the pilots for drugs and alcohol ==
ALPA (the Air Line Pilots Association), which was the labor union representing the two pilots of flight 5050, sequestered the pilots and refused to reveal their whereabouts until such time that any testing for drugs and alcohol would be useless. This made the NTSB investigators so upset that a very unusual and strong statement was included in the official accident report:

The Safety Board is extremely concerned that no federal investigators were allowed to speak to the pilots of flight 5050 until almost 40 hours after the accident. Specific requests to USAir and ALPA to interview the pilots and to have them provide toxicological samples were made about ten hours and again about 20 hours after the accident. USAir representatives stated they did not know where the pilots were sequestered. The Air Line Pilots Association representatives initially stated that they also did not know where the pilots were, then later stated that their location was being withheld so they could not be found by the media. This complicated the investigative process to a great degree. The sequestering of the pilots for such an extended period of time in many respects borders on interference with a federal investigation and is inexcusable.

The FAA was in the process of preparing subpoenas to compel the pilots to present themselves to NTSB accident investigators, when the pilots finally relented and appeared, some 44 hours after the accident. The FAA was processing an emergency suspension of their licenses for failing to present themselves to investigators promptly after the crash. An FAA official said the pilots are entitled to legal counsel, but it is a regulation that they have to talk to the FAA after an accident.

The pilots were requested to provide both blood and urine samples. Upon the advice of their ALPA attorney, they refused to provide any blood samples, but did give urine samples. ALPA officials refused to respond to questions submitted by media reporters. Local law-enforcement officials were attempting to track down rumors that the FO had told Port Authority police after the crash, that the captain had been "mumbling and acting irrationally just before takeoff." However, they were never able to find any witnesses to substantiate that rumor.

The FAA followed through with a suspension of their licenses, shortly after they finally appeared.

== NTSB probable cause ==
The National Transportation Safety Board determines that the probable cause of this accident was the captain's failure to exercise his command authority in a timely manner to reject the takeoff or take sufficient control to continue the takeoff, which was initiated with a mistrimmed rudder. Also causal was the captain's failure to detect the mistrimmed rudder before the takeoff was attempted.

== See also ==
- US Airways Flight 1549, which was flying the same route for the successor airline to USAir, US Airways
- Water landing
