= Houseboats in New York City =

New Yorkers have lived on houseboats since the 19th century, docking across several boroughs. Historically, houseboat dwellers were typically men who worked on barges in the Hudson River. Since the 1940s, houseboat inhabitants have mostly chosen to live aboard for pleasure. Boats offer cheap housing, good views, and privacy. In 1999, it was estimated to be several hundred houseboats in New York City.

== Newtown Creek ==
Several houseboats are docked on the Newtown Creek. These include the MV Schamonchi, a former Martha's Vineyard Ferry that ended up in Brooklyn when it was decommissioned and sold in 2005. The Schamonchi served as a squat and a party space, and owners paid to dock it at 190 Morgan. Other boats are rented out to tenants. Most boats are docked on city land, without a marina, so owners do not pay to park their boat. Boat dwellers have faced eviction several times from the city's Small Business Services Department and the Transportation Department.

== Hudson River ==
The 79th Street Boat Basin is a marina on the Upper West Side of Manhattan. People have lived there since the 1960s, when the Parks Department leased the marina to third-party management companies, who allowed for live-aboards. In the 1970s, rents were about $200 per month. The 1990s brought disputes between boat dwellers and the city, which resumed management in 1989. It was home to roughly 60 people when the marina closed in 2021 for renovation.

In the 1990s, the Floating Neutrinos junk raft Town Hall was anchored off Pier 25.

Houseboats are also located at the Newport Marina in Jersey City.

== Rockaways ==
Rockaway, Queens, is also a popular place for docking houseboats. Chef Ben Sargent had a houseboat there which was sunk by renters. Marina 59 allows overnight stays but not full-time habitation. This marina was the site of the Boatel, a popular boat hotel that ran for several years before closing after Hurricane Sandy.

== Other houseboat locations ==
City Island in the Bronx is also a location for houseboat dwellers. Great Kills Harbor in Staten Island is another marina where people live on boats. Inwood was home to two sites of houseboats: on the Harlem River near 207th St, and along the Spuyten Duyvil Creek near Inwood Hill.

== Prison ships ==
Prisoners have lived on ships throughout New York City's history, including American prisoners of war held by British ships during the Revolutionary War, commemorated by the Prison Ship Martyrs' Monument in Fort Greene Park. Currently the Vernon C. Bain Correctional Center, a floating jail barge, is docked near Rikers Island.
