= Rikers Island Bridge =

Bridge between Queens and Rikers Island, New York

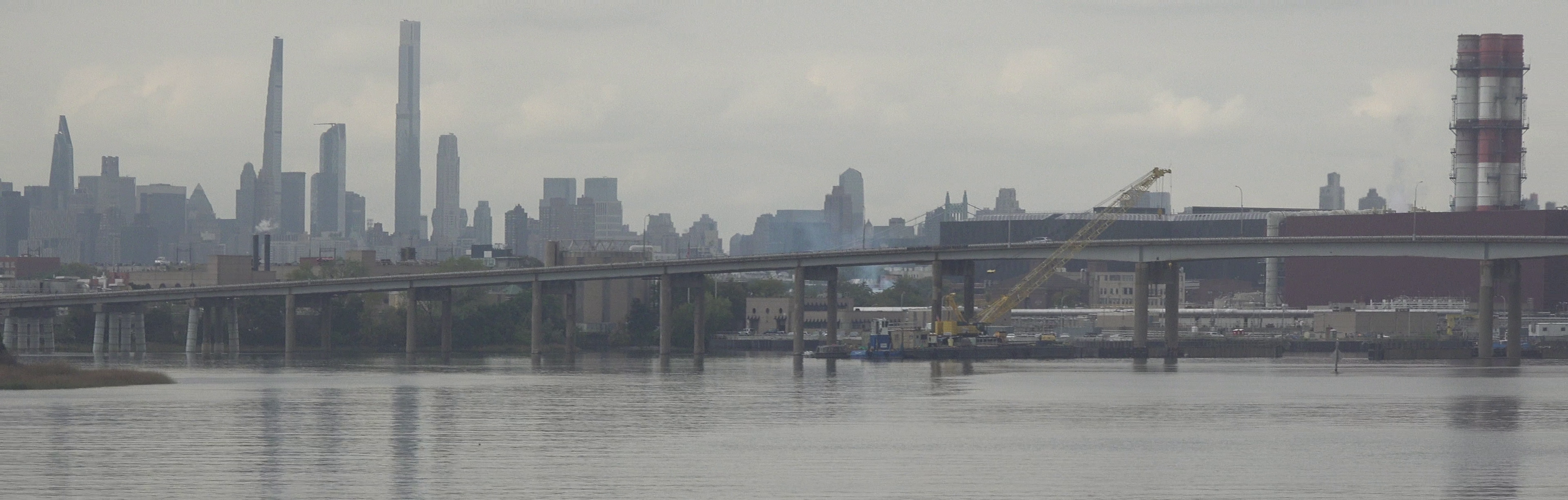
- Rikers Island Bridge, seen from LaGuardia Airport, 2024
- Coordinates: 40°46′55″N 73°53′18″W
- Carries: 3 lanes of roadway; 1 sidewalk
- Crosses: East River (Rikers Island Channel) and Bowery Bay
- Locale: Rikers Island and Queens in New York City

Characteristics
- Design: Girder bridge
- Material: Concrete, steel
- Total length: 4,200 feet (1,280 m)
- Clearance below: 52 ft

History
- Opened: November 22, 1966

Statistics
- Daily traffic: 14,817 (2016)

Location
- Interactive map of Rikers Island Bridge

Rikers Island Bridge (officially named Francis R. Buono Memorial Bridge) is a girder bridge that connects Rikers Island in the borough of the Bronx with the borough of Queens in New York City. The bridge begins in the Ditmars Steinway area in Astoria, Queens, near the intersection of Hazen Street and 19th Avenue, and continues to the south side of Rikers Island.

== Description ==
The Rikers Island Bridge is the sole route to the island for vehicular traffic. The bridge is a fixed low-level span built with concrete and steel. At its center, the bridge has a 52-foot rise allowing clearance for vessels passing beneath the structure. The Q100 MTA Bus route operates across the Rikers Island Bridge and provides service to the Rikers Island Visitor Center.

The bridge crosses the Rikers Island Channel of the East River and Bowery Bay. It is located near LaGuardia Airport and crosses over the approach light pier to Runway 13.

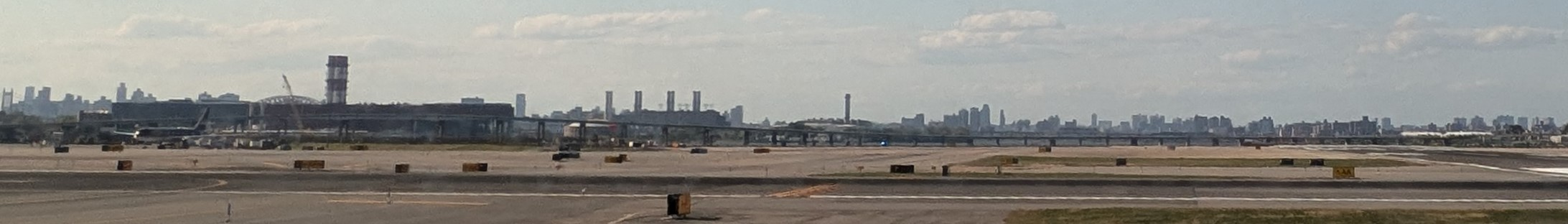
Wide-angle shot of the bridge as seen from LaGuardia Airport

== History ==
Before the bridge opened, the only access to Rikers Island was by a ferry, which cost New York City $250,000 per year to operate. The bridge was proposed in order to provide easier access by fire, police, ambulances, and sanitation vehicles, and to reduce the commute times for employees. The New York City Planning Board approved the building of the bridge in 1962. Rikers Island Bridge opened on November 22, 1966. New York City spent $10 million to build the bridge. The city said it saved $410 million in construction costs for structures on the island during the five years after the bridge opened, and that the bridge would also save $5,000 in operating expenses per year. The bridge is supported by 260 concrete piles, each up to 124 feet (38 m) long.

On May 25, 1978, the bridge was co-named for the late Supervising Warden Francis R. Buono, who directed its construction. In August 1990, during a labor conflict with then New York City mayor David Dinkins, guards responded to a breakdown in negotiations by barricading access to the bridge.
