= World's Fair Marina =

Public marina in Queens, New York

Coordinates: 40°45′41″N 73°51′17″W

The World's Fair Marina is a public marina in Flushing Bay, Queens, New York. It is located at the northern edge of Flushing Meadows–Corona Park, next to a 1.4-mile (2.3 km) long stretch of promenade around Flushing Bay, and near LaGuardia Airport and Citi Field. It is operated by the Marine Division of the Department of Parks and Recreation.

== Overview ==
The marina has over 250 slips for vessels up to 120 feet (37 m) in length, a boat and kayak launch, and a ferry landing. The ferry landing is currently used by SeaStreak, which provides service to Highlands, New Jersey for selected New York Mets games. Several party and event boats operate cruises from the marina. A free ferry operated by New York Water Taxi provides service between Pier 11/Wall Street and the East 34th Street Ferry Landing in Manhattan and the World's Fair Marina, for the US Open and before Mets games.

The parking lot is next to the Grand Central Parkway. The marina's administration building constructed for the 1964 World's Fair now houses the New York City Department of Parks & Recreation Marine Division office and the World's Fair Marina Restaurant & Banquet Hall.

== History ==
A boat basin was constructed for the 1939 New York World's Fair. Robert Moses had the marina redesigned and expanded to accommodate 800 boats for the 1964 New York World's Fair, which was held in the same location.

Ferry service to baseball games began in 1989 with American Skimmer providing service between Pier 11/Wall Street and the East 34th Street Ferry Landing in Manhattan. NY Waterway later began operating a similar ferry service in 1998.

The Parks Department has run the marina since 1999. Previously, it had been run by a private concessionaire.

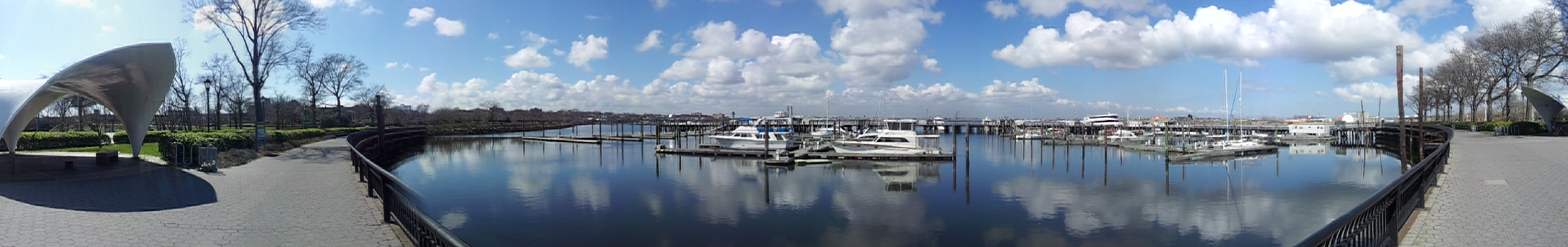
