= Delta Air Lines Flight 1086 =

2015 aviation accident in New York

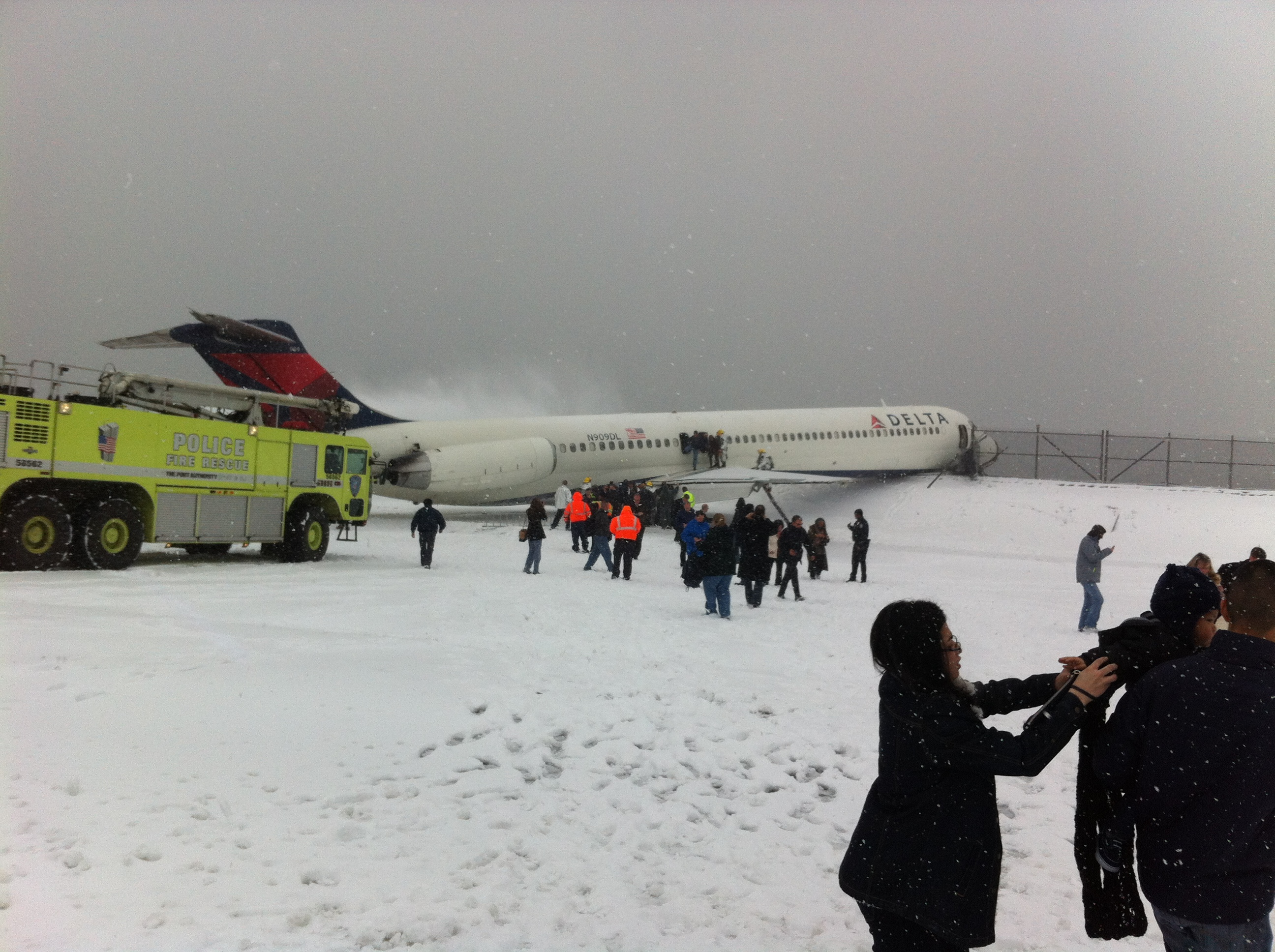
- The aircraft as it came to rest on the seawall after breaking through the airport perimeter fence

Accident
- Date: March 5, 2015
- Summary: Runway excursion following loss of directional control due to pilot error
- Site: LaGuardia Airport, New York City, United States; 40°46′33.6″N 73°51′47.9″W

Aircraft
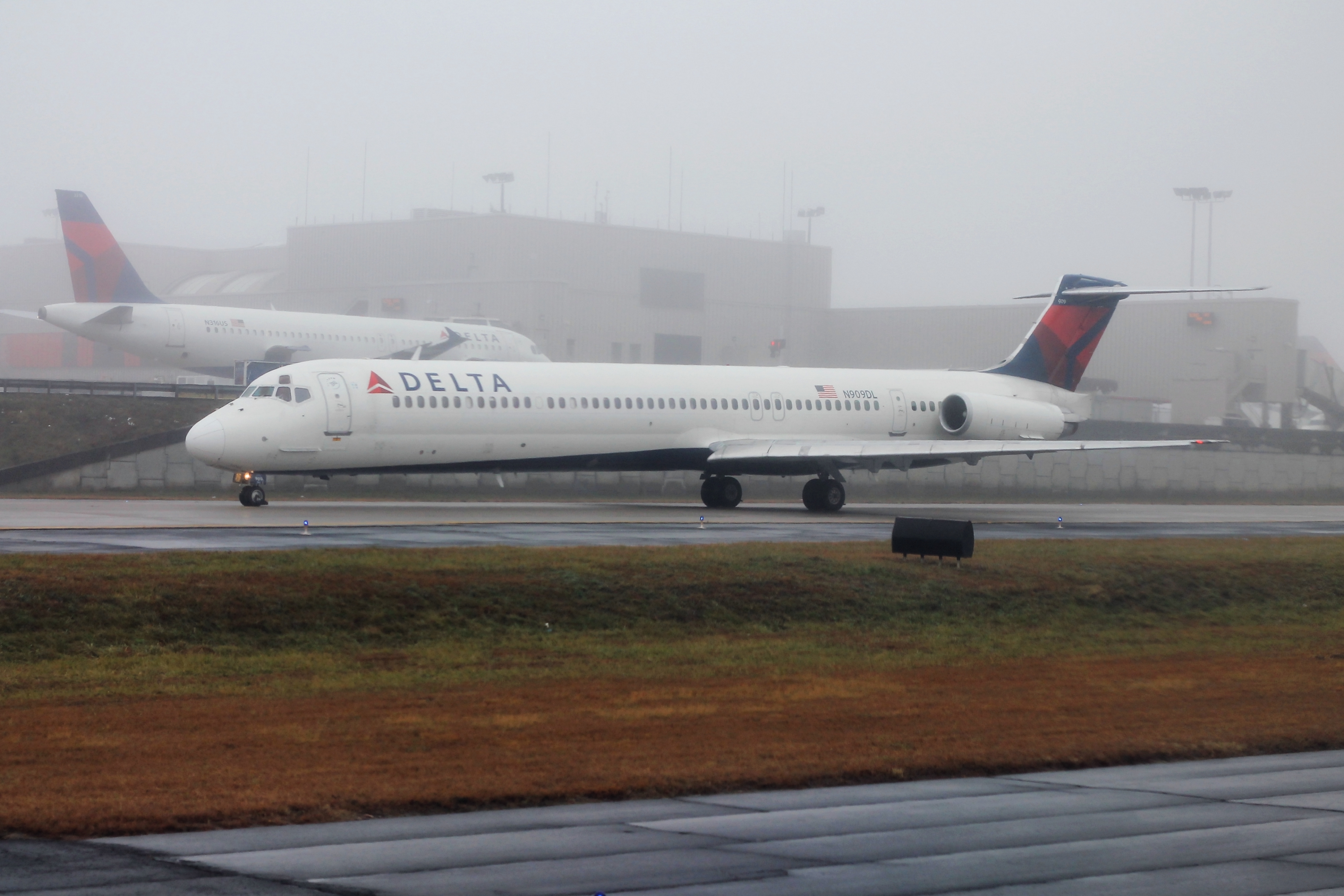
- N909DL, the aircraft involved in the accident, photographed in January 2015
- Aircraft type: McDonnell Douglas MD-88
- Operator: Delta Air Lines
- IATA flight No.: DL1086
- ICAO flight No.: DAL1086
- Call sign: DELTA 1086
- Registration: N909DL
- Flight origin: Hartsfield–Jackson Atlanta International Airport, Atlanta, United States
- Destination: LaGuardia Airport, New York City, United States
- Occupants: 132
- Passengers: 127
- Crew: 5
- Fatalities: 0
- Injuries: 29
- Survivors: 132

Delta Air Lines Flight 1086 was a scheduled Delta Air Lines domestic passenger flight between Atlanta and New York's LaGuardia Airport. On March 5, 2015, the McDonnell Douglas MD-88 aircraft veered off the runway shortly after landing at LaGuardia Airport in New York City. The plane ran up the seawall berm and struck the perimeter fence, sliding along it for approximately 940 feet (290 m) before coming to rest with the nose of the aircraft hanging over the berm above Flushing Bay. There were no fatalities, although 29 people suffered minor injuries. The aircraft was seriously damaged and written off.

The final report by the National Transportation Safety Board (NTSB) found the probable cause of the accident was the pilot's "inability to maintain directional control of the airplane due to his application of excessive reverse thrust, which degraded the effectiveness of the rudder in controlling the airplane's heading."

== Background ==
=== Aircraft ===
The aircraft involved was a McDonnell Douglas MD-88, registered as N909DL, with serial number 49540, manufactured in July 1987, and delivered new to Delta on December 30, 1987. It had accumulated 71,196 total flight hours and 54,865 total flight cycles prior to the accident.

Regularly scheduled 600-flight hour, 2200-flight hour, and 760-day maintenance checks were completed in the six months prior to the accident, all with no discrepancies. The aircraft's last major maintenance check was on September 22, 2014, in Jacksonville, Florida, and included, among other things, tests of the autobrake, anti-skid and auto-spoiler systems. The aircraft's last overnight service check was completed March 2, 2015 in Tampa, Florida.

=== Crew ===
In command was 56-year-old Captain Theodore W. Lauer, a former United States Air Force (1980–1989) pilot who had joined Delta in August 1989. He had 15,200 flight hours, including 11,000 hours on the MD-88 and MD-90.

His co-pilot was 46-year-old First Officer David W. Phillips, who had been with Delta since 2007 and had logged 11,000 flight hours, with 3,000 of them on the MD-88 and MD-90. He previously served as a United States Navy pilot from 1991 to 2012. Other members of the flight crew were not publicly identified.

== History of the flight ==
Flight 1086 took off from Hartsfield–Jackson Atlanta International Airport at 8:45am EST, and was scheduled to land at LaGuardia Airport at 10:48 am. LaGuardia Airport was under falling snow and freezing fog conditions at the time of arrival, with the captain reportedly telling passengers that weather problems could cause a delay. Another Delta Air Lines MD-88 had landed on runway 13 about three minutes prior to Flight 1086. The pilots of this preceding flight confirmed that air traffic controllers relayed the braking action reports to the flight crew of Delta 1086; these reports were based on pilot reports from two other flights that landed several minutes prior to flight 1086. Both earlier flights had reported the braking action on the runway as "good". Statements by the pilots to the NTSB after the crash revealed that the runway appeared all white (covered with snow) when the airplane descended out of the overcast, seconds before landing.

== Accident ==
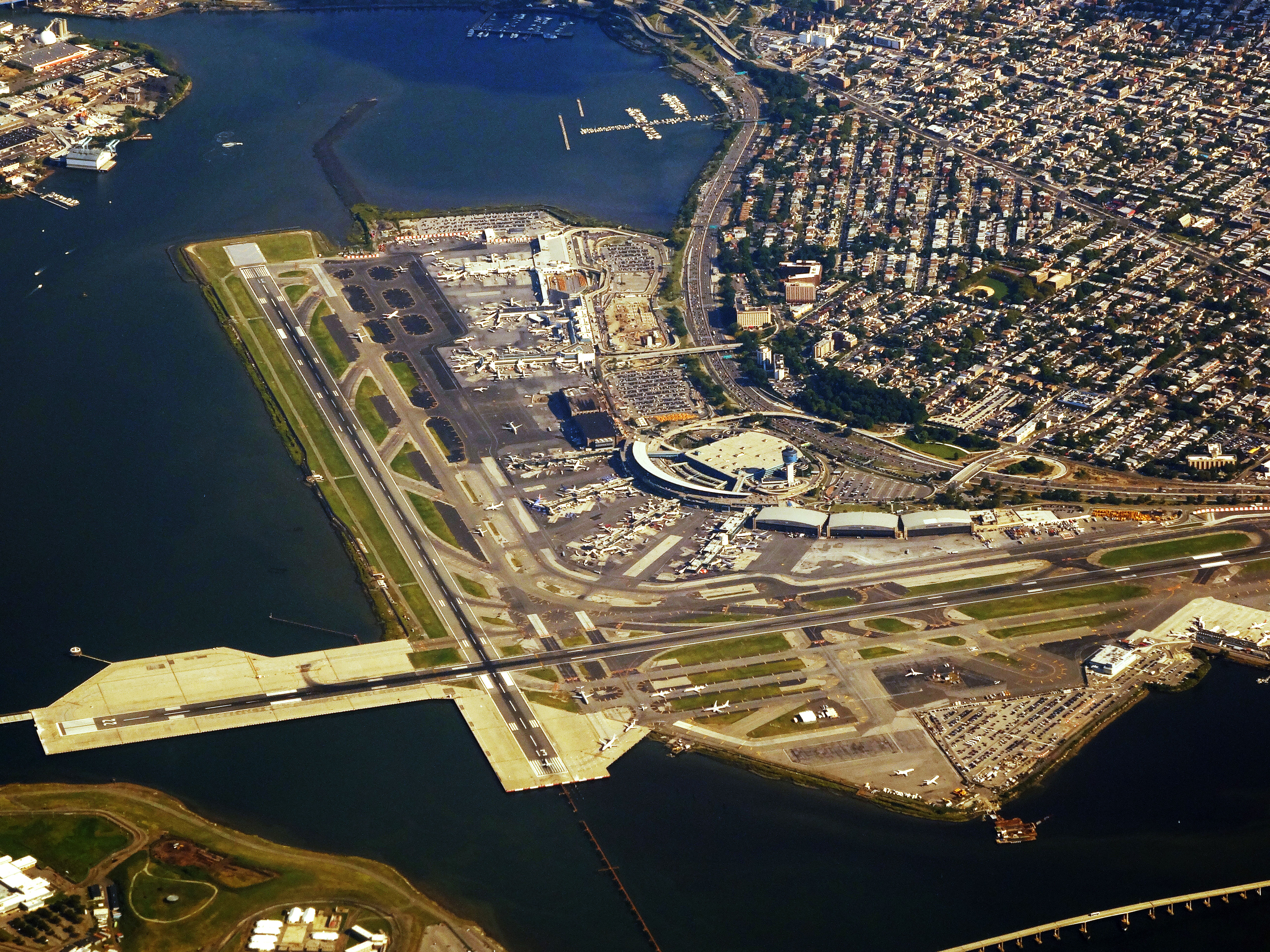
LaGuardia Airport: Runway 13 starts at the bottom-center of the photo and extends towards the top left.

The aircraft was approaching runway 13 to land on what appeared to be a normal final approach. The aircraft was aligned with the runway centerline, the autopilot remained engaged until the aircraft was about 230 feet (70 m) above ground level, and airspeed during the final approach was about 140 knots (160 mph; 260 km/h), and 133 knots (153 mph; 246 km/h) at touchdown. The aircraft touched down at 11:02 am with the main landing gear close to the runway centerline. The MD-88 veered off the left side of the runway shortly after touchdown, about 3,000 feet (910 m) from the approach end of the runway, on a heading approximately 10 degrees left of the runway heading. The MD-88 skidded left across the snowy airfield until about 4,100 feet (1,200 m) from the approach end of the runway, when the aircraft ran up the berm and the left wing struck the airport perimeter fence. It then was forced back onto a heading parallel with runway 13, and continued sliding in this direction for another 900 feet (270 m) along the perimeter fence, before coming to rest about 5,000 feet (1,500 m) from the approach end of runway 13, with the nose of the aircraft hanging over the berm. The left wing of the aircraft destroyed approximately 940 feet (290 m) of airport perimeter fence.

The aircraft sustained significant structural damage. There was major damage to the left wing's leading edge, leading edge slats, trailing edge flaps, and spoilers. The left wing fuel tank was breached near the outboard end of the outboard flaps. The front radome and weather radar were heavily damaged, and damage to the underside of the fuselage extended from the front of the aircraft back to the left front passenger door. The nose landing gear well and the main electronics bay also were damaged. Delta subsequently declared the aircraft a hull loss, making the accident the 37th hull loss of a McDonnell Douglas MD-80.

The crew of the plane managed a complete evacuation only after more than 17 minutes, while the aircraft was leaking fuel. Twenty-nine passengers suffered minor injuries, all of whom were sent to the hospital. Two days later, all injured passengers had been discharged.

The airport was closed immediately after the accident at approximately 11 am. The other runway was reopened beginning at 2:30 pm. Runway 13/31 was closed until 10:30 am the next morning as emergency services cleared the accident site and the aircraft was removed into a hangar.

Among the passengers on the flight was former football player Larry Donnell.

== Investigation ==
On March 6, 2015, the NTSB reported that the cockpit voice recorder was successfully downloaded, and contained two hours of high-quality recordings and captured the entire flight. Additionally, the flight data recorder (a 25-hour tape-based recorder) was examined and found to have captured the entire flight and approximately 50 parameters of data, including airspeed, altitude, heading, and information on engines and flight controls, among other data. An NTSB meteorologist examined the weather conditions at the time of the accident, to determine if weather was a contributing factor to the accident. The National Transportation Safety Board also analyzed and developed the transcript of the cockpit voice recorder.

NTSB investigators examined and tested the antiskid, autobrake, and thrust reverser systems on the aircraft. The autobrake selector switch in the cockpit was found in the "max" position. The tailcone handle in the main cabin had been actuated, presumably for evacuation purposes, and the rear tailcone had detached.

Initial statements given by the pilots to the NTSB reveal a number of factors that may have contributed to the accident. The pilots stated they based their decision to land on braking action reports of "good," which they received from air traffic control before landing (based on reports given by aircraft landing immediately before them). Another Delta MD-88 landed on the same runway just three minutes prior to the accident flight's landing. The runway appeared "all white" to the pilots when they broke out of the overcast, indicating it was covered with snow. The NTSB investigation found that runway snow clearing had most recently taken place about 20–25 minutes prior to the accident. Upon landing, the pilots noted that the automatic spoilers did not deploy to slow the aircraft as they should have, but the first officer quickly deployed them manually. Also, the autobrakes were set to "max," but the pilots did not sense any wheel brake deceleration. The captain also reported that he was unable to prevent the airplane from drifting left.

According to the NTSB investigation update issued on April 2, 2015, investigators found that Delta's MD-88 pilot operational materials (manuals) contained guidance recommending that pilots limit the reverse thrust engine pressure ratio (EPR) to 1.3 when landing on "contaminated" runways, i.e., runways with increased levels of risk related to deceleration and directional control. The investigation has found that the EPR was at 1.9 at six seconds after touchdown, however, based on readout from the flight data recorder. The investigation also found that, upon landing, brake pressure increased in a manner consistent with autobrake application.

According to a March 9, 2015, article in The Wall Street Journal, "Pilots and air-safety experts have long known that when the MD-88s reversers are deployed, its rudder, or large vertical tail panel intended to help turn the nose, sometimes may not be powerful enough to control left or right deviations from the center of runways."

The final report by the NTSB found the probable cause of the accident was the pilot's "inability to maintain directional control of the airplane due to his application of excessive reverse thrust, which degraded the effectiveness of the rudder in controlling the airplane's heading."

== Aftermath ==
On February 28, 2018, the Port Authority of New York and New Jersey filed a lawsuit against Delta and Captain Lauer, citing negligence was involved in the accident. The Port Authority dropped the charges on March 1, 2018, according to NY State Supreme Court records.
