= Schofield Pass =

Mountain pass in Colorado, USA

- Location within Colorado
- Elevation: 10,707 feet (3,263 m)
- Traversed by: Unimproved road

Third Approach
- Location: Gunnison County, Colorado, U.S.
- Range: Sawatch Range
- Coordinates: 39°00′54″N 107°02′48″W
- Topo map: USGS Snowmass Mountain

Schofield Pass, elevation 10,707 ft (3,263 m), is a mountain pass in the Elk Mountains of Colorado. The pass is the high point on Gothic Road, which connects the towns of Marble and Crested Butte. The pass is closed for most of the year due to snow or mud, and is open only for one or two months in late summer.

The road over the summit to the townsite of Schofield is suitable for a passenger car with moderate clearance if traveling from Crested Butte; however, between Schofield and the town of Crystal it becomes recommended for Jeeps and ATVs only as it descends into the Devil's Punchbowl Canyon and becomes an exposed, narrow, rocky shelf road. From the northwest, high clearance vehicles can make it from Marble to Crystal via two routes.

The road west of the pass is considered one of the most dangerous in Colorado. In 1970, an over-loaded vehicle ran off the road and into Crystal River, killing 9 of the 12 passengers.

Schofield Pass was named for B. F. Schofield, a silver miner.

== Climate ==
Climate data for Schofield Pass, Colorado, 1991–2020 normals, 1985-2020 extremes: 10700ft (3261m)
Month	Jan	Feb	Mar	Apr	May	Jun	Jul	Aug	Sep	Oct	Nov	Dec	Year
Record high °F (°C)	63 (17)	62 (17)	64 (18)	66 (19)	76 (24)	78 (26)	80 (27)	78 (26)	75 (24)	67 (19)	70 (21)	60 (16)	80 (27)
Mean maximum °F (°C)	48.0 (8.9)	47.2 (8.4)	53.4 (11.9)	58.4 (14.7)	65.5 (18.6)	71.8 (22.1)	75.3 (24.1)	71.9 (22.2)	68.4 (20.2)	60.6 (15.9)	53.7 (12.1)	45.9 (7.7)	76.0 (24.4)
Mean daily maximum °F (°C)	31.2 (−0.4)	32.4 (0.2)	39.9 (4.4)	45.2 (7.3)	53.9 (12.2)	62.4 (16.9)	67.5 (19.7)	64.8 (18.2)	58.1 (14.5)	47.5 (8.6)	37.5 (3.1)	30.0 (−1.1)	47.5 (8.6)
Daily mean °F (°C)	18.7 (−7.4)	19.9 (−6.7)	26.5 (−3.1)	32.3 (0.2)	41.0 (5.0)	49.1 (9.5)	54.4 (12.4)	52.6 (11.4)	46.4 (8.0)	36.0 (2.2)	25.8 (−3.4)	18.3 (−7.6)	35.1 (1.7)
Mean daily minimum °F (°C)	6.3 (−14.3)	7.3 (−13.7)	12.8 (−10.7)	19.4 (−7.0)	27.9 (−2.3)	35.6 (2.0)	41.2 (5.1)	40.4 (4.7)	34.6 (1.4)	24.6 (−4.1)	13.9 (−10.1)	6.5 (−14.2)	22.5 (−5.3)
Mean minimum °F (°C)	−11.3 (−24.1)	−10.4 (−23.6)	−5.1 (−20.6)	4.2 (−15.4)	14.4 (−9.8)	26.0 (−3.3)	35.0 (1.7)	34.6 (1.4)	22.8 (−5.1)	6.6 (−14.1)	−6.9 (−21.6)	−13.1 (−25.1)	−16.6 (−27.0)
Record low °F (°C)	−22 (−30)	−25 (−32)	−14 (−26)	−8 (−22)	2 (−17)	11 (−12)	27 (−3)	25 (−4)	0 (−18)	−7 (−22)	−19 (−28)	−28 (−33)	−28 (−33)
Average precipitation inches (mm)	5.63 (143)	6.21 (158)	5.39 (137)	5.31 (135)	3.27 (83)	1.39 (35)	2.19 (56)	2.47 (63)	2.88 (73)	3.54 (90)	4.65 (118)	5.12 (130)	48.05 (1,221)
Average extreme snow depth inches (cm)	75.8 (193)	90.7 (230)	98.1 (249)	91.9 (233)	74.5 (189)	26.1 (66)	4.1 (10)	3.6 (9.1)	3.7 (9.4)	11.8 (30)	32.5 (83)	55.7 (141)	100.3 (255)
Average precipitation days (≥ 0.01 in)	16.2	16.3	16.6	16.8	12.5	7.1	9.1	10.1	10.7	11.8	14.0	15.0	156.2
Source 1: XMACIS2(normals, records & 1997-2020 snow depth)
Source 2: NOAA (precip/precip days)

== See also ==
- Colorado mountain passes
