= Southwest Airlines Flight 345 =

2013 aviation accident in New York

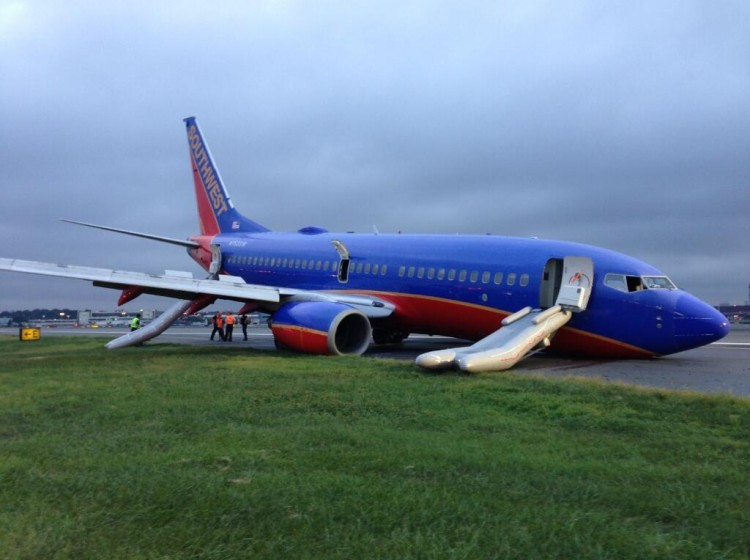
- The aircraft after the evacuation, with its emergency slides deployed

Accident
- Date: July 22, 2013
- Summary: Landing gear collapse on landing due to pilot error
- Site: LaGuardia Airport, New York City, United States; 40°46′29″N 73°52′44″W

Aircraft
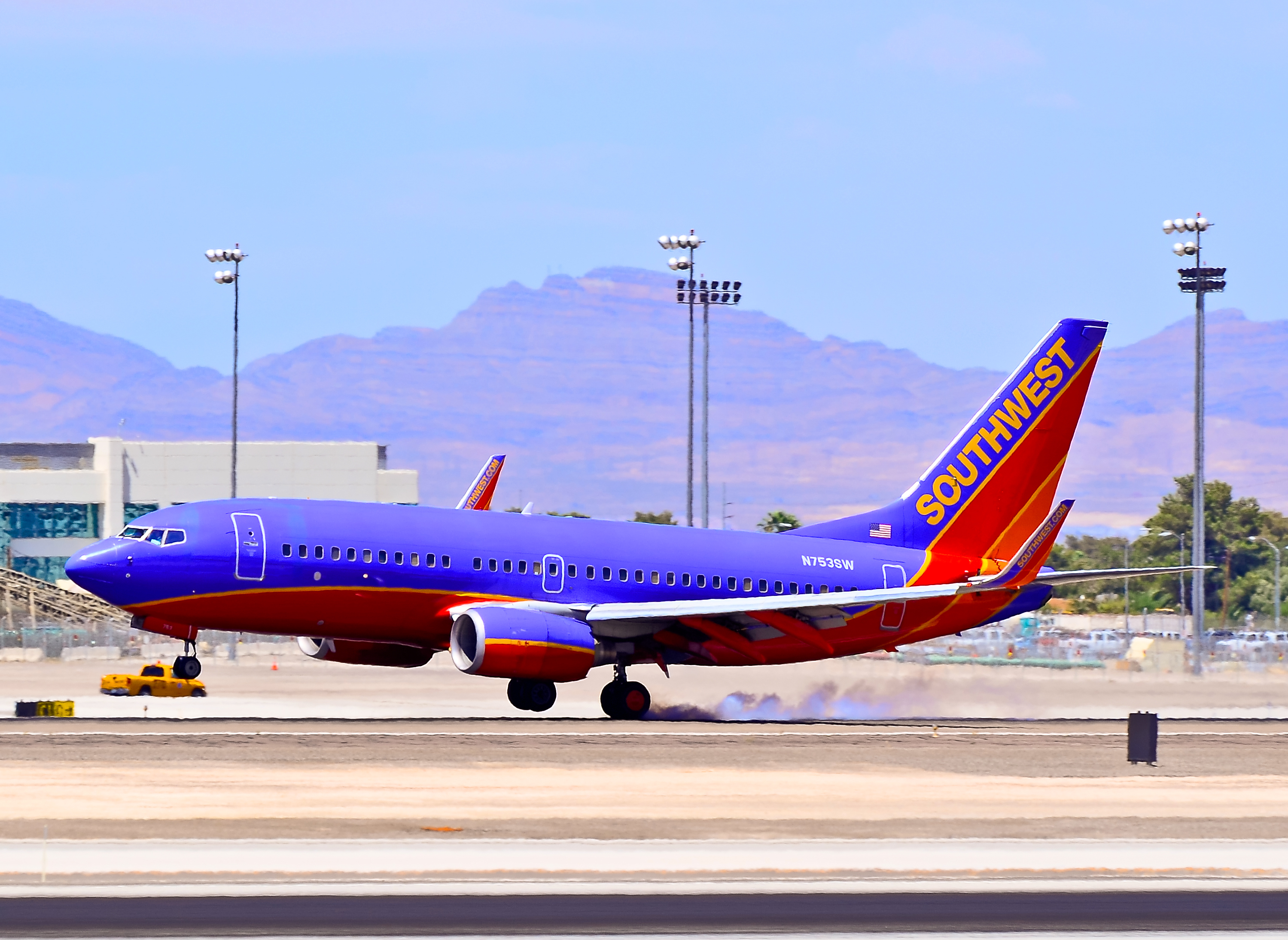
- N753SW, the aircraft involved in the accident, seen in 2011
- Aircraft type: Boeing 737-7H4
- Operator: Southwest Airlines
- IATA flight No.: WN345
- ICAO flight No.: SWA345
- Call sign: SOUTHWEST 345
- Registration: N753SW
- Flight origin: Nashville International Airport, Tennessee, United States
- Destination: LaGuardia Airport, New York City, United States
- Occupants: 150
- Passengers: 145
- Crew: 5
- Fatalities: 0
- Injuries: 9
- Survivors: 150

Southwest Airlines Flight 345 was a scheduled flight from Nashville International Airport, Tennessee, to New York City's LaGuardia Airport. On July 22, 2013, the Boeing 737-700 operating the route suffered a front landing-gear collapse while landing at LaGuardia Airport, injuring 9 people on board. The aircraft, which was worth an estimated $15.5 million at the time, was written off and scrapped as a result of the accident.

== Accident ==
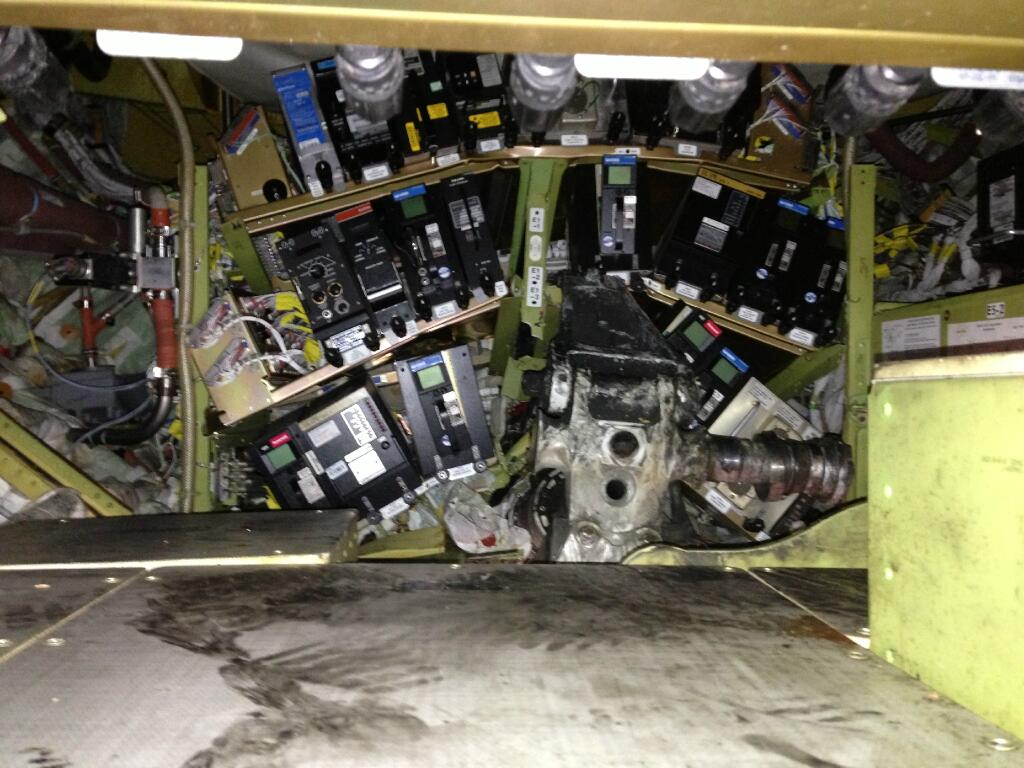
NTSB file photo, showing the extent of the damage to the electronics bay, with the collapsed nose gear jammed into it, only the right axle attached

The aircraft landed on runway 4 with its nose landing gear touching down prior to the main landing gear. The aircraft's nose gear collapsed upward into the body of the aircraft, causing substantial damage to the avionics electronics bay in the fuselage. The aircraft slid 2,175 feet (663 m) on its nose along the runway, arresting off to the right of the runway pavement. The plane came to a stop halfway down the runway after skidding on its nose in a shower of sparks.

As a result of the crash, the two-runway airport was closed until its rescue assets were available again. Two hours later, the airport's other runway reopened for traffic. The airport cleared and inspected the affected runway, then removed the aircraft in time for the earliest next-day departures. Nine occupants were treated for minor injuries, all sustained during evacuation, six of whom were taken to local hospitals.

Passengers aboard the aircraft complained about Southwest’s handling of the incident. The pilot made no announcement, and the flight attendants forgot their protocols. The passengers were kept on board the aircraft as smoke filled the cabin for 20 minutes before finally evacuating the airplane. There were no emergency responders at the scene.

== Aircraft and crew ==
The aircraft was a 13-year-old Boeing 737-7H4, registered as N753SW, owned and operated by Southwest Airlines. The serial number of the aircraft was 29848 and its line number was 400. The aircraft first flew on October 6, 1999, and was delivered to Southwest Airlines on October 21.

Flight 345's captain, who was 49 years old, had flown for Southwest Airlines for nearly 13 years, six years in the rank of captain. At the time of the accident, she had a total of 12,000 hours of flight time, including 2,600 flight hours as captain of a Boeing 737.

The first officer, who was 44 years old, had 20 years of prior experience in the United States Air Force and had been hired by Southwest Airlines a year and a half before the accident.

== Investigation ==
On July 26, 2013, the National Transportation Safety Board (NTSB) issued a press release disclosing its initial findings, which included:

- The cockpit voice recorder recorded two hours of good data, including the full duration of the last flight from Nashville to New York City.
- The flight data recorder provided 27 hours of data, including all parameters for the last flight from Nashville to New York City.
- From the flight data recorder download:
  - The flaps were changed, from 30 to 40°, 56 seconds before touchdown.
  - The aircraft flared reaching 134 knots indicated airspeed (KIAS) and an attitude of 2° nose-up at 32 ft (9.8 m) above ground level (AGL), then four seconds later dropped the nose to 3° nose-down at 133 KIAS at touchdown.
  - The aircraft came to rest 19 seconds after touchdown.
- Both the obtained flight data and the available video record have the nose gear making contact with the ground before the main landing gear, which is the opposite order from the normal landing sequence.

No mechanical malfunctions were found, but the nose landing gear collapsed due to stress overload. The NTSB's investigation became focused on the behavior of the flight crew during Flight 345's approach into LaGuardia Airport. The NTSB discovered that Flight 345's captain had been the subject of multiple complaints by first officers who had flown with her. Southwest's flight-operations manual requires its pilots to abort a landing if the plane is not properly configured by the time it descends to 1,000 ft (300 m) AGL. Analyzing flight recorder data, the NTSB determined that the captain had changed the airplane's flaps from 30 to 40° at an altitude of only 500 ft (150 m). At 100–200 ft (30–61 m), the captain observed that the plane was still above the glide slope, and ordered the first officer to "get down" instead of aborting the landing. At an altitude of only 27 ft (8.2 m) and three seconds from touching down, the captain took control of the aircraft from the first officer. The plane was descending at 960 ft/min (4.9 m/s) in a nose-down position when its nose wheel struck the runway.

The NTSB ultimately concluded that the crash was due to pilot error. Specifically, the NTSB faulted the captain for failing to take control of the aircraft or abort the landing earlier, noting that the captain had warnings at 500 ft (150 m) (due to the flaps misconfiguration) and at 100–200 ft (30–61 m) (when the captain observed the plane was above the glide slope), and could have aborted the landing at that time. The NTSB determined that the captain's failure to take control until the plane had descended to only 27 ft (8.2 m) "did not allow her adequate time to correct the airplane's deteriorating energy state and prevent the nose landing gear from striking the runway."

== Aftermath ==
On October 2, 2013, Southwest Airlines announced that it had fired Flight 345's captain. The airline also announced that it was requiring Flight 345's first officer to undergo additional training. Neither pilot was publicly identified by the airline.

The Boeing 737 involved in the accident, worth an estimated $15.5 million at the time, was found to be too extensively damaged to be repaired, so was written off as a total loss. The aircraft was ultimately removed from LaGuardia Airport via barge to the Port of Albany (New York) in November 2013, where the airframe was broken up by a salvage dealer at the Port of Albany in March 2014, with some parts trucked to Owego for final destruction. The accident represents the third hull loss of a Boeing 737-700.
