= Autobrake =

Airplane system

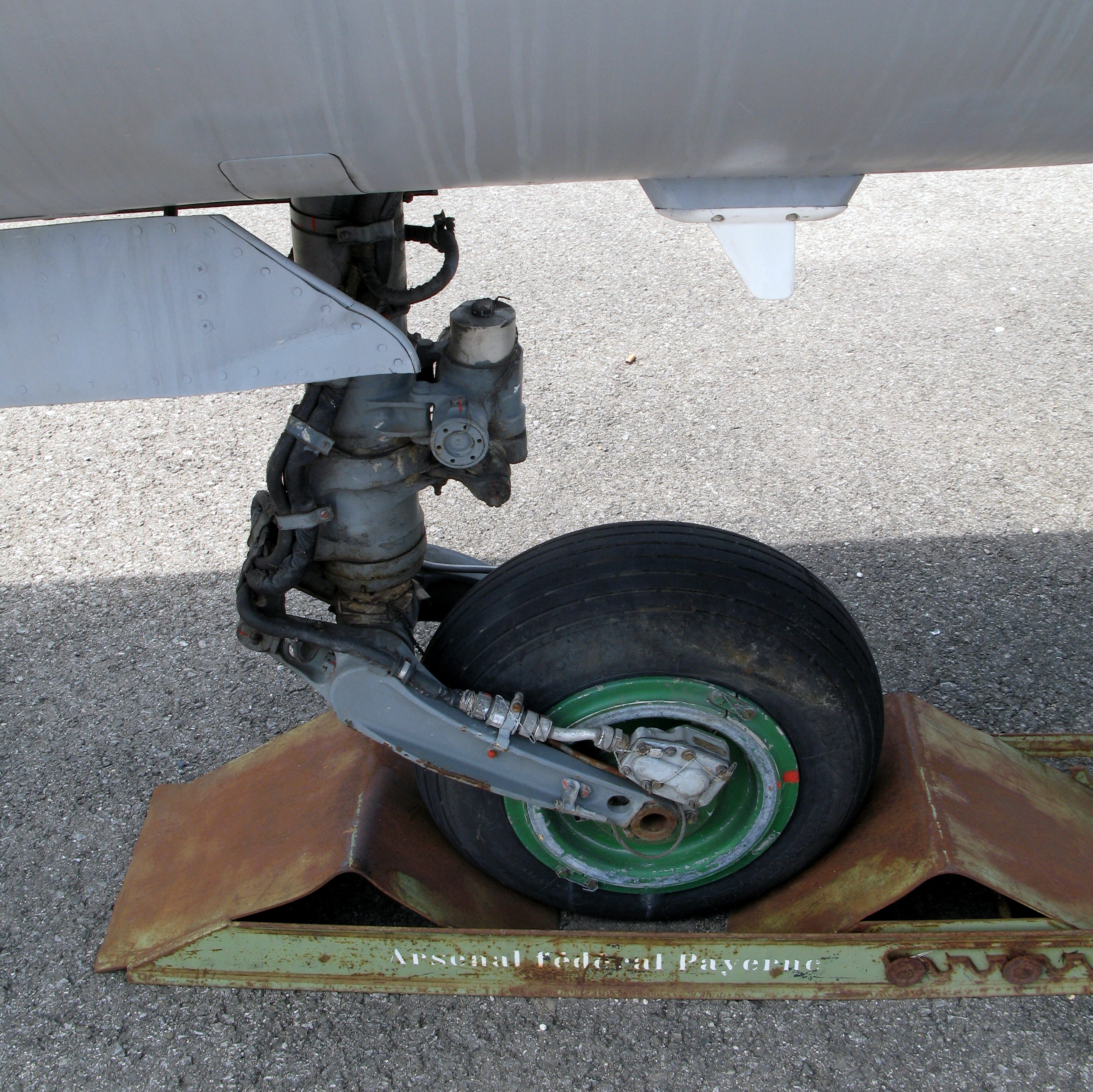
MiG-21 nose landing gear (1955). The skid sensor is visible on the wheel.

An autobrake is a type of automatic wheel-based hydraulic brake system for advanced airplanes. The autobrake is normally enabled during takeoff and landing procedures, when the aircraft's longitudinal deceleration system can be handled by the automated systems of the aircraft itself in order to keep the pilot free to perform other tasks.

== Landing ==
While landing, the autobrake can help to free up the pilot to allow monitoring other systems (such as the execution of the landing flare). There are usually several settings for the rate of deceleration. The selection of these settings are normally undertaken on the aircraft instrument panel before landing. Aircraft have multiple autobrake settings, with higher settings providing more aggressive braking forces. These are set based on factors such as runway length or desired exit point from the runway.

When the landing feature of the autobrake is engaged, the aircraft automatically engages pressurized wheel braking upon touchdown to the landing surface. During the roll out, application of the brake pedals transfers control back to the pilot.

One of the main advantages of engaging the autobrake as opposed to manually pressing on brake pedals is the uniform deceleration mechanism of the autobrake. The aircraft automatically decelerates at the selected level regardless of other factors, such as aircraft drag and other deceleration methods such as deployment of thrust reversers or spoilers.

== Rejected takeoff ==
While taking off, the aircraft's autobrake can be set to the rejected takeoff mode, commonly indicated on an aircraft instrument panel as RTO. In case of the Airbus A300-600 and A320 family models, "MAX" mode is set. In RTO setting, the aircraft monitors certain variables, depending on the autobrake model. Most autobrakes engage RTO braking if the pilot returns the throttle to the "idle" position, or if reverse thrust is engaged. Other autobrake systems may monitor critical flight controls for failures.
