= Artell =

Artell is an English surname. Notable people with the surname include:

- David Artell (born 1980), English footballer and manager
- Darlene Artell Hartman (born 1934), American writer and speaker

== See also ==
- Artel (disambiguation)
