= Artel (disambiguation) =

Artel may refer to:

- Artel, various cooperative associations that existed in the Russian Empire and the Soviet Union
- ARTĚL, Bohemian glass company
- Artel Electronics, an Uzbek company

Persons

- Artel Great (b. 1981), American actor and filmmaker
- Rael Artel (b. 1980), Estonian art writer, curator and gallerist

== See also ==
- Artel Staratelei "Amur" Airlines
- Artell
