= Wake turbulence category =

Weight classification for aircraft for purposes of take-off and landing

Wake turbulence categories and wake turbulence groups are defined by the International Civil Aviation Organization for the purpose of separating aircraft in flight, due to wake turbulence.

== Wake turbulence categories ==
Since 2020, four categories of wake turbulence exist based on maximum certified take-off mass:

- Light (L) — aircraft types of 7,000 kg or less.
- Medium (M) — aircraft types more than 7,000 kg but less than 136,000 kg; and
- Heavy (H) — all aircraft types of 136,000 kg or more, with the exception of aircraft types in Super (J) category; and
- Super (J) — aircraft types specified as such in ICAO Doc 8643, Aircraft Type Designators. As of 2025, this only includes the Airbus A380, with a maximum takeoff weight (MTOW) of 575 t (1,268,000 lb).

Before its destruction, the single Antonov An-225's MTOW of 640 t (1,410,000 lb) was considered Super by the FAA, though was still classified as Heavy by the ICAO. The Scaled Composites Model 351 Stratolaunch, despite an MTOW of 1,300,000 lb (590 t) (exceeding the A380), is also considered Heavy by both the FAA and ICAO. Only the Airbus A380 and Antonov An-124 Ruslan are classified by the UK Civil Aviation Authority as Super.

Most wide-body aircraft are classified as Heavy. Not all aircraft variants of the same type have the same wake turbulence category: the narrow-bodied Boeing 707-100 is Medium, for example, whereas the later 707-300 is Heavy.

=== Radio communication ===
The word "super" or "heavy" should be included by super or heavy aircraft immediately after the aircraft call-sign in initial radio contact with air traffic service (ATS) units, to warn ATS and other aircraft that they should leave additional separation to avoid this wake turbulence.

=== Distance-based separation minima ===
Distance-based separation minima for approach and departure are given by ICAO as follows:

Preceding aircraft	Succeeding aircraft	Distance-based wake turbulence separation minima
Super	Heavy	9.3 kilometres (5.0 nmi)
Super	Medium	13 kilometres (7.0 nmi)
Super	Light	14.9 kilometres (8.0 nmi)
Heavy	Heavy	7.4 kilometres (4.0 nmi)
Heavy	Medium	9.3 kilometres (5.0 nmi)
Heavy	Light	11.1 kilometres (6.0 nmi)
Medium	Light	9.3 kilometres (5.0 nmi)

=== Time-based separation minima ===
For landing aircraft, time-based separation minima are as follows:

- HEAVY aircraft landing behind SUPER aircraft — 2 minutes
- MEDIUM aircraft landing behind SUPER aircraft — 3 minutes
- MEDIUM aircraft landing behind HEAVY aircraft — 2 minutes
- LIGHT aircraft landing behind SUPER aircraft — 4 minutes
- LIGHT aircraft landing behind HEAVY or MEDIUM aircraft — 3 minutes

For departing aircraft, time-based separation minima are more complicated and depend on the runways used, but range from 2 minutes to 4 minutes.

=== United States of America ===
In the United States, the FAA uses a slightly different categorization, adding a block between medium and heavy, labeling aircraft capable of maximum takeoff weights more than 41,000 pounds (19 t) and less than 300,000 pounds (140 t) as "Large".

Of special note here is the narrow-bodied Boeing 757. With an MTOW of 116,000 kilograms (256,000 lb), the 757 is classified as Large. However, after a number of accidents where smaller aircraft following closely behind a 757 crashed, tests were carried out showing the 757 generated stronger wake vortices than a Boeing 767. The rules were changed so that controllers are required to apply special wake turbulence separation criteria specified in paragraph 5-5-4 in the FAA guidelines for aircraft separation, as if the 757 were heavy.

== Wake turbulence groups ==
In addition to wake turbulence categories, ICAO also specifies wake turbulence groups. These are based on wing span as well as maximum takeoff mass. There are seven groups, A to G.

Wake turbulence groups were introduced to enable reduced separation requirements, although in some cases separation is increased. They are used when permitted by the appropriate air traffic service authority.

Wake turbulence groups enable distance-based separation minima for approach and departure as low as 3 nautical miles. Time-based separation minima are used for separating departing aircraft only. Separation minima range from 80 seconds to 240 seconds.

== History ==
Wake turbulence categories have existed since at least 1996.

The "Super" category was introduced in 2020 by ICAO, however it had already been introduced by the FAA in 2014.

Wake turbulence groups originated in the United States. In 2012, the FAA authorized Memphis International Airport air traffic controllers to begin applying revised criteria for separation. This initially used six groups of aircraft, primarily based on weight: Super (A380), Heavy, B757, Large, Small+, and Small.

The FAA continued Wake Turbulence Recategorization, or RECAT. In 2013, RECAT was extended from Memphis to 6 other airports. In RECAT Phase I, the groups were replaced with six groups, A to F, based on weight, certificated approach speeds, and wing characteristics, with special consideration given to aircraft with limited ability to counteract adverse rolls. These groups were named "Super", "Upper Heavy", "Lower Heavy", "Upper Large", "Lower Large", and "Small". In some cases, separation was increased but in other cases it was reduced. The revised spacing between these groups was shown to increase airport capacity. The FAA estimated an increase in capacity of 15% at Memphis, and average taxi time for FedEx (Memphis' largest carrier, with about 500 operations per day in 2012) aircraft was cut by three minutes.

RECAT Phase II was a continuation of the RECAT program that focused on a larger variety of aircraft (123 ICAO type designators that make up more than 99% of US air traffic movements based on 32 US airports), as opposed to the 61 aircraft comprising 85% of operations from 5 US and 3 European airports that were used in RECAT Phase I. The wake separations in RECAT Phase II were not defined by wake turbulence groups, but individual pairs of make-model-series aircraft types (e.g. Boeing B747-400 leading Airbus A321). In the US, automation does not yet exist to allow air traffic controllers to utilize this pairwise separation matrix. Instead, RECAT Phase II takes advantage of the underlying matrix to redefine the RECAT Phase I-type categories (i.e. Categories A–F, with an additional Category G) for individual TRACONs (terminal radar approach control). This allows efficiency gains over RECAT I because it takes the fleet mix – which aircraft fly most often – into account for each site, rather than doing a global optimization for the US national airspace system as a whole. RECAT Phase II went operational on August 3, 2016, at Southern California TRACON and associated towers.

In RECAT Phase III, which was in development as of 2016, atmospheric conditions were taken into account.

In Europe, the programme to increase runway throughput by introducing new wake turbulence groups was called RECAT-EU. With a database of over 100,000 wake measurements, EUROCONTROL also developed six wake turbulence groups. The change was partly prompted by the development of the Airbus A380. The previous three wake turbulence categories were increased to six, by splitting Medium and Heavy into pairs, and adding a Super category for the Airbus A380. Capacity gains of up to 8% were achieved.

RECAT-EU was initially deployed at Paris Charles de Gaulle and Paris Le Bourget airports in 2016.

RECAT-EU for arrivals and departures was successfully deployed by NATS at London Heathrow Airport in March 2018.

In RECAT-2, the six categories were augmented by individual pair-wise separation, based on the characteristics of the lead and following aircraft types. RECAT-3 further augments this by using real-time data including ground-based measurements of wake decay. In strong headwinds, reduced time based separation can be used because vortices are dispersed more quickly.

The seven wake turbulence groups were adopted by ICAO in 2020.

== See also ==
- Single European Sky ATM Research (SESAR)
- Aircraft approach category
