= Aeroflot Flight Sh-4 =

1970 aviation accident in the Soviet Union

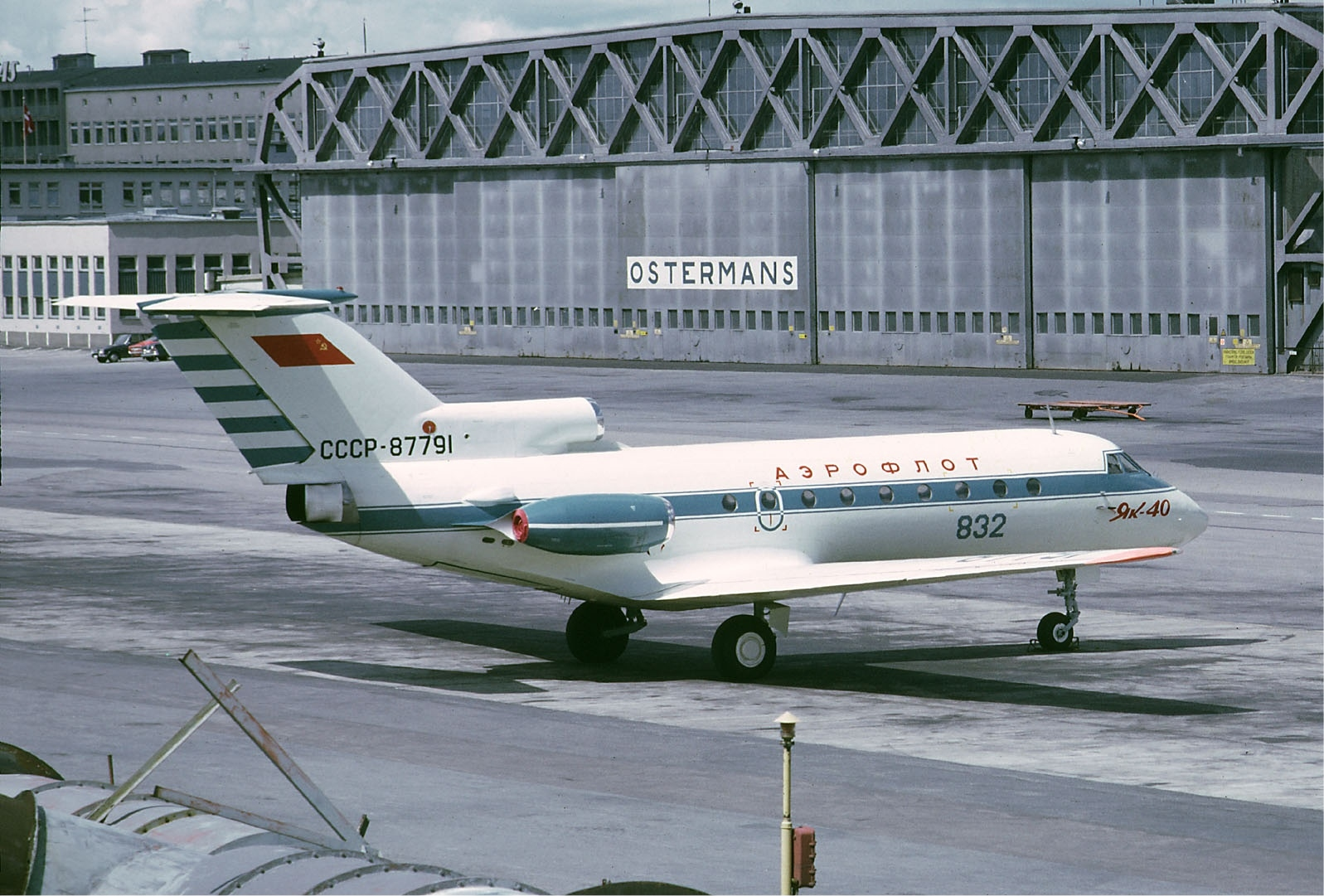
- An Aeroflot Yak-40, similar to the accident aircraft.

Accident
- Date: 3 September 1970
- Summary: Controlled flight into terrain due to pilot error
- Site: Mount Airy-Tash, Asht District, Sughd Region, TaSSR

Aircraft
- Aircraft type: Yakovlev Yak-40
- Operator: Aeroflot (Tajik UGA, Dushanbe OJSC)
- Registration: CCCP-87690
- Flight origin: Frunzensky Airport
- Stopover: Leninabad Airport
- Destination: Dushanbe Airport
- Occupants: 21
- Passengers: 18
- Crew: 3
- Fatalities: 21
- Survivors: 0

On September 3, 1970, a Yakovlev Yak-40, operating Aeroflot Flight Sh-4, collided with Mount Airy-Tash in the Tajik Soviet Socialist Republic, a constituent republic of the Soviet Union. The crash resulted in 21 fatalities and was the first fatal accident and hull loss of a Yak-40.

== Aircraft ==
The Yak-40, registration CCCP-87690 (MSN 9910503 - Serial number 03-05), was manufactured at the Saratov Aviation Plant on March 1, 1969, and was transferred to the Ministry of Civil Aviation of the USSR, which on March 12 sent the aircraft to the Dushanbe Aviation Unit of the Tajik Civil Aviation Directorate. The aircraft had the maximum capacity of 24 passengers. At the time of the accident, the aircraft had accumulated 1020 flight hours and 1344 cycles.

== Accident ==
Flight Sh-4, being operated by the Yak-40, was flying the first leg by the flight crew of the 186th squadron, consisting of commander (PIC) V. F. Sutormin, first officer G. V. Karpov, and flight engineer V. T. Shashkina. The aircraft had 18 passengers onboard the flight. The aircraft departed Frunzensky Airport at 20:24, reaching the assigned altitude of 5,700 m (18,700 ft).

After the aircraft flew over the Toktogul Dam, the controller instructed the flight to descend to 5,700 meters (18,700 ft). After descending to the instructed altitude, the aircraft began to deviate 30-50 kilometers north. The crew contacted the dispatcher of Kokand about the flight path of flying over the towns of Namangan and Kokand. At the same time, the controller failed to inspect where the flight was on the radar and did not know where its position was but gave permission to descend to 3,300 meters (10,800 ft). The crew of the Yak-40 followed the instructions, descending into the height of the mountains, which was higher than the aircraft’s altitude. The dispatcher in Kokand had instructed the captain to contact Leninabad Airport; without warning the dispatcher in Leninabad (now known as Khujand) and the aircraft’s crew, there was no radar contact within the area.

The crew did not realize that the aircraft had deviated to the west from the flight route. The crew radioed to ATC that they had passed over the towns of Namangan and Kokand. At 21:21, Leninabad ATC cleared the crew to descend to 3,300 m (10,800 ft) and then 2,100 m (6,900 ft), although they did not know the exact position of the aircraft

At 21:26, the flight, flying at 2100 meters at a speed of 500 km/h (310 mph), struck the side of Mount Airy-Tash (90 km from Leninabad) at an altitude of 2,300 meters (7,500 ft) and was destroyed on impact, killing the 21 occupants onboard.

== See also ==
- Aeroflot accidents and incidents
- Aeroflot accidents and incidents in the 1970s
