= Delta Air Lines Flight 9570 =

1972 aviation accident

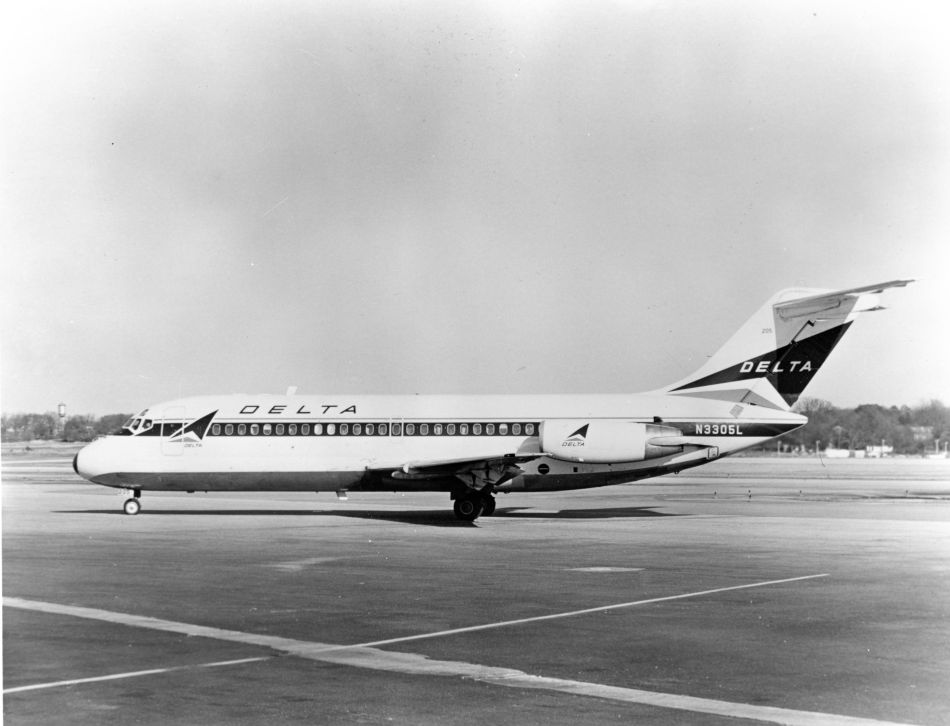
- N3305L, the aircraft involved in the accident

Accident
- Date: May 30, 1972
- Summary: Wake turbulence
- Site: Greater Southwest International Airport, Fort Worth, Texas; 32°49′48.74″N 97°2′56.28″W

Aircraft
- Aircraft type: McDonnell Douglas DC-9-14
- Operator: Delta Air Lines
- IATA flight No.: DL9570
- ICAO flight No.: DAL9570
- Call sign: DELTA 9570
- Registration: N3305L
- Flight origin: Dallas Love Field, Dallas, Texas, United States
- Stopover: Greater Southwest International Airport, Fort Worth, Texas, United States
- Destination: Dallas Love Field, Dallas, Texas United States
- Occupants: 4
- Crew: 4
- Fatalities: 4
- Survivors: 0

On May 30, 1972, Delta Air Lines Flight 9570 crashed while attempting to land at the Greater Southwest International Airport (GSW) in Fort Worth, Texas, during a training flight. All four occupants aboard the training flight were killed. The crash was determined to be caused by the aircraft flying through wake turbulence, and led to sweeping changes in procedures for maintaining minimum safe distance behind aircraft that generate substantial wake turbulence.

== Aircraft and crew ==
Delta Air Lines Flight 9570 was a training flight operated using a McDonnell Douglas DC-9-14 (registration (registration N3305L). The aircraft was manufactured in 1965, and had operated for 18,998 hours at the time of the accident. The purpose of the flight was to flight check three Delta pilots. Flight 9570 had a total of four occupants, including the two-man flight crew actually flying the aircraft, an additional pilot awaiting his flight check, who would have been riding in the rear, and an FAA air carrier operations inspector, who was on board for proficiency checking, and was riding in the “jump seat”, a fold down seat between the pilot and co-pilot.

Also involved in the accident was American Airlines Flight 1114, a training flight conducted using a McDonnell Douglas DC-10. Flight 1114 was not damaged or affected by the accident.

== Accident ==
On May 30, 1972, Flight 9570 departed Dallas Love Field in Dallas, Texas, at 06:48 Central Daylight Time, and proceeded to GSW to perform training approaches and landings. Flight 9570 requested an ILS approach to GSW's Runway 13. The clearance was granted, and Flight 9570 was advised that the American Airlines DC-10 was already in the traffic pattern to perform "touch-and-go landings" at GSW. Flight 9570 landed without incident.

After landing at GSW, Flight 9570 received new takeoff and climb-out clearances, made training maneuvers including an ILS missed approach. Flight 9570 then requested approval for landing on Runway 13, behind the American DC-10 which was also inbound for a landing on the same runway. The air traffic controller gave Flight 9570 clearance to land on Runway 13 with an advisory "caution, turbulence". The controller did not advise the DC-9 that they were following a "heavy", though the controller did advise that they were following a DC-10 which experienced pilots should have known was a "heavy" aircraft.

On approach to the runway, the DC-9 began to oscillate about the roll axis, then rolled rapidly to the right. After rolling 90 degrees to the right, the right wingtip struck the runway. The airplane continued to roll to the right, until the fuselage struck the runway in a nearly inverted position. The aircraft was damaged by impact forces, and destroyed by a subsequent fire. All four occupants were killed.

== Investigation ==
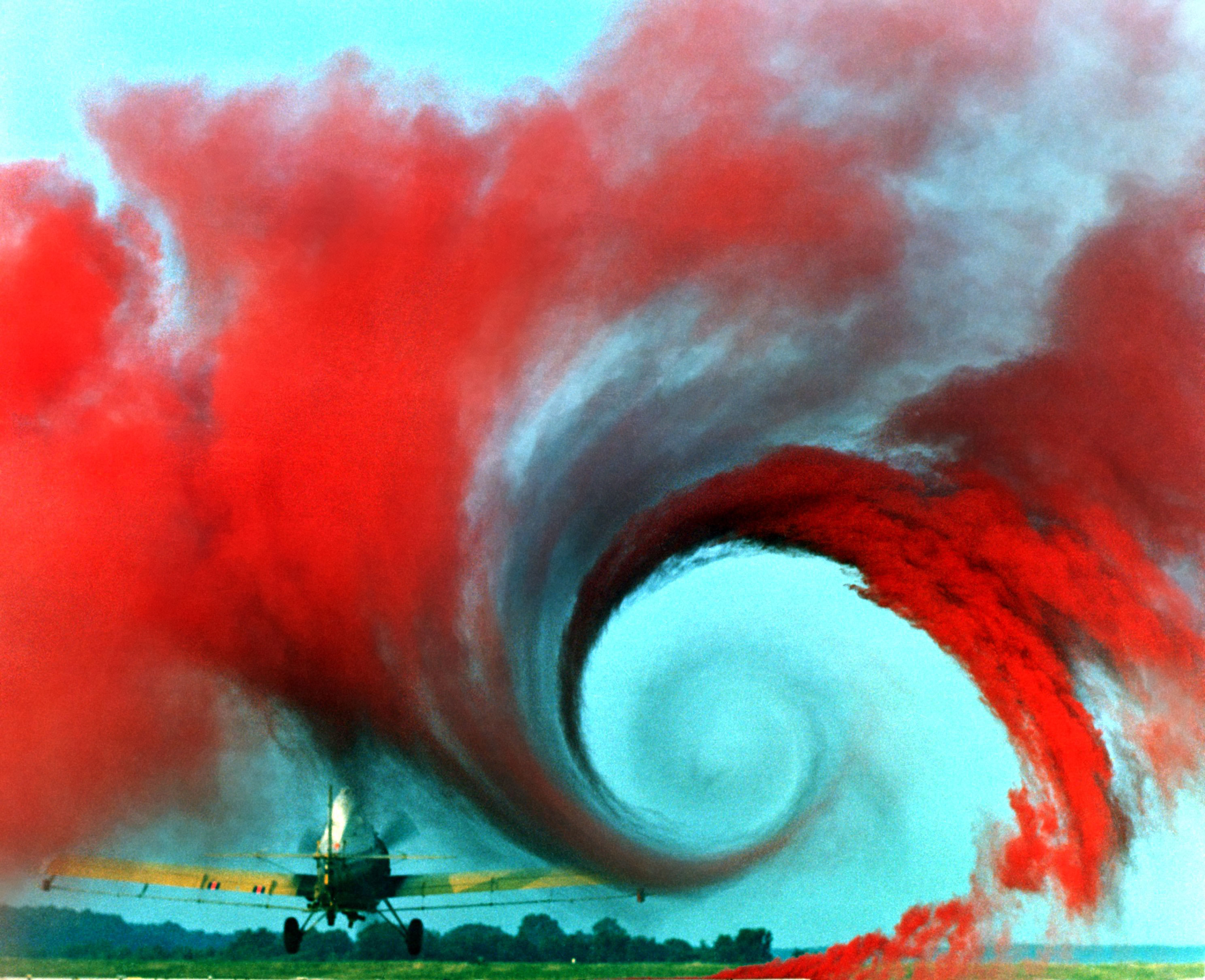
Wake turbulence seen after an aircraft passes through colored smoke, similar to tests performed by the NTSB.

The National Transportation Safety Board (NTSB) investigated the accident. The manner of the crash suggested to the NTSB that the accident was caused by wake turbulence from the DC-10 it had followed. Prior to the Flight 9570 accident, the Federal Aviation Administration had no specific wake turbulence based aircraft separation standards in place. Instead, separation was determined by air traffic control radar resolution limits and, in some cases, runway occupancy restrictions. However, the rapidly increasing use of large jets that cause substantial wake turbulence, such as the Boeing 747, DC-10, and Lockheed L-1011 TriStar in recent years had increased the risk of wake turbulence related accidents. However, prior to Flight 9570, most accidents involving wake turbulence involved smaller aircraft than the DC-9.

Recognizing wake turbulence as a potential cause, the NTSB performed test and research activities to confirm their hypothesis. The NTSB performed wake vortex testing at the National Aviation Facilities Experimental Center at Atlantic City Airport in New Jersey, initially using a Lockheed L-1011 (a trijet similar in size to the DC-10) and then later using a DC-10 loaned to the NTSB. Colored smoke was emitted from the airport control tower, and observations of the smoke as an L-1011 or DC-10 aircraft flew by the tower provided information about the length of time a vortex would remain after the aircraft was clear.

The NTSB's tests demonstrated that the wake turbulence caused by an aircraft the size of the DC-10 was sufficient to upset the flight of a following DC-9 to the magnitude experienced by Flight 9570. Following these tests, the probable cause of the accident was determined to be:

An encounter with a trailing vortex generated by a preceding "heavy" jet which resulted in an involuntary loss of control of the airplane during final approach. Although cautioned to expect turbulence the crew did not have sufficient information to evaluate accurately the hazard or the possible location of the vortex. Existing FAA procedures for controlling VFR flight did not provide the same protection from a vortex encounter as was provided to flights being given radar vectors in either IFR or VFR conditions.

== Impact ==
While the risk to small aircraft was already known, the crash of Flight 9570 demonstrated that medium-sized aircraft such as the DC-9 were also vulnerable to wake turbulence. As a result, the investigation into Flight 9570 prompted changes to the minimum distance that all small and medium sized aircraft must maintain when following "heavy" aircraft, and the procedures for maintaining those distances.

The NTSB recommended that the FAA develop new minimum aircraft separation standards that take into account wake separation effects of larger aircraft on following aircraft. In response, the FAA developed mandatory minimum separation requirements based on maximum takeoff weight. All aircraft weighing more than 300,000 pounds would be classified as "heavy". Under the new rules, any plane lighter than a "heavy" must maintain at least five miles of separation behind a "heavy" aircraft; a "heavy" behind another "heavy" must maintain four miles of separation. These regulations became the standard for maintaining minimum safe distance between aircraft; the definition of "heavy" was revised downward to aircraft weighing at least 255,000 pounds in 1994.

== See also ==
- Aviation safety
- List of accidents and incidents involving commercial aircraft
