= Mayan World Airlines =

Airline in Guatemala

- Mayan World Airlines logo
IATA	ICAO	Call sign
EY	MYN	MAYANWORLD
- Commenced operations: 1996
- Ceased operations: 1999
- Fleet size: 2
- Headquarters: Flores

Mayan World Airlines was an airline based in Guatemala.

== Code data ==
- ICAO Code: MYN
- Call-sign: Mayan World
- 2-letter code: EY

== Fleet ==
As of August 2006, the Mayan World Airlines fleet included:

- 1 Yakovlev Yak-40
- 1 ATR 42-300

== Destinations ==
As of November 1999 Mayan World Airlines flew to:

- Cancún
- Guatemala City
- Flores(Guatemala)
