= Greater Southwest International Airport =

Former airport in Fort Worth, Texas, United States (1953–1974)

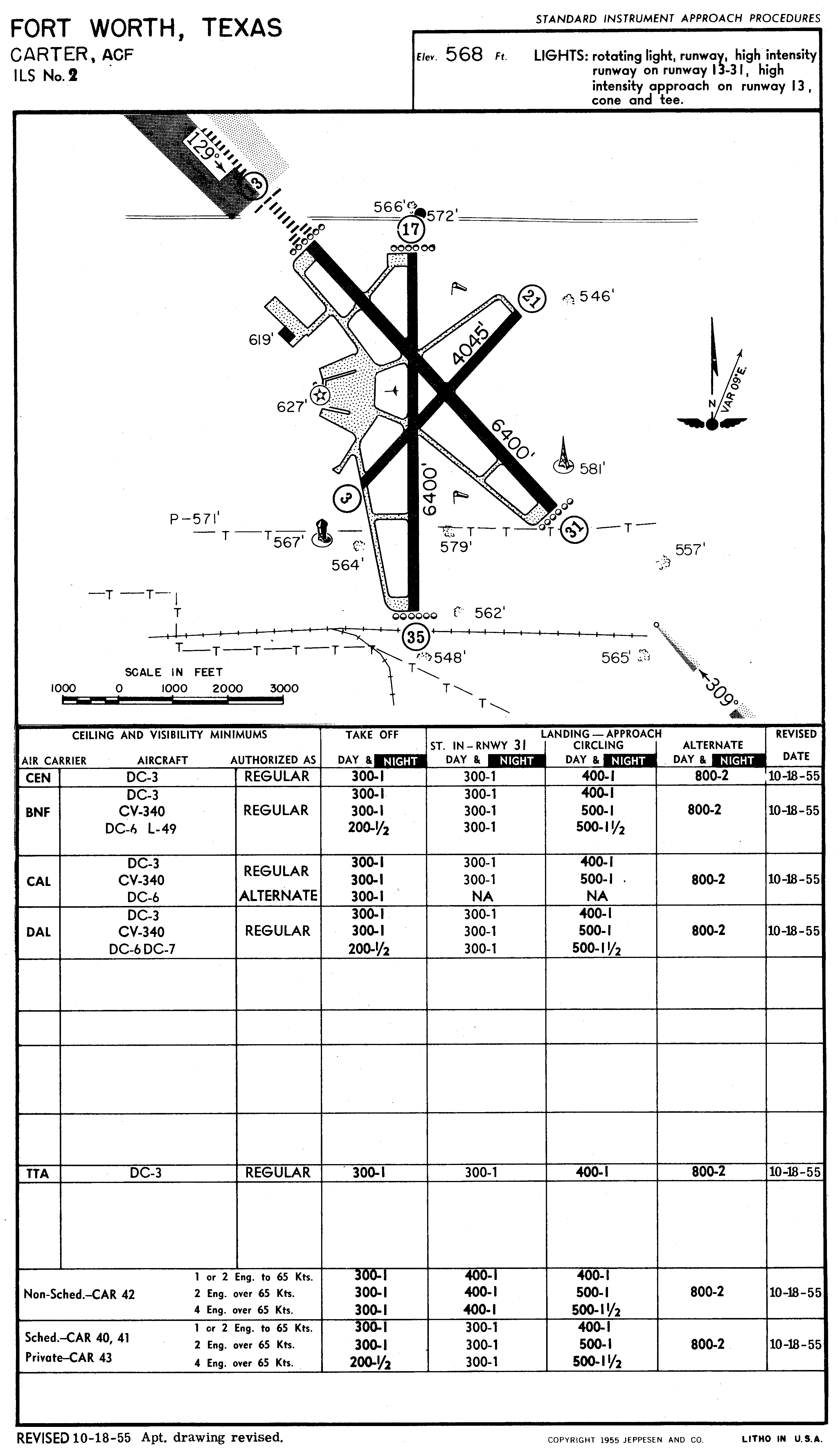
- IATA: GSW; ICAO: KGSW; FAA LID: GSW

Summary
- Airport type: Defunct
- Operator: Allied Fueling Company
- Serves: Dallas–Fort Worth metroplex
- Location: Fort Worth, Texas
- Opened: 1953
- Closed: January 13, 1974
- Elevation AMSL: 568 ft / 173 m
- Coordinates: 32°49′53″N 097°02′57″W
- Interactive map of Greater Southwest International Airport

Runways
Direction	Length		Surface
Direction	ft	m	Surface
17/35	9,000	2,743	Concrete
13/31	8,460	2,579	Concrete

Greater Southwest International Airport (IATA: GSW, ICAO: KGSW, FAA LID: GSW) — originally Amon Carter Field (ACF) — was a commercial airport serving Fort Worth, Texas, from 1953 until 1974. Dallas Fort Worth International Airport (DFW) opened in 1974 a few miles north to replace Greater Southwest and Dallas Love Field as a single airport for the Dallas–Fort Worth metroplex (though Love Field survives). The area is now a commercial/light-industrial park serving DFW International, centered along Amon Carter Boulevard, which follows the old north-south runway.

== Early history ==
As far back as 1927, the cities of Fort Worth and Dallas had proposed a regional airport that would serve the entire metropolitan area. Initial plans did not come to fruition, and after World War II, Fort Worth decided to move the primary airline traffic from Meacham Field to a new facility, Amon Carter Field. Fort Worth annexed a finger of land to the east, extending the city limits to encompass the new site.

American, Braniff, Central, Continental, Delta, Eastern, Frontier, and Trans-Texas Airways operated from the airport, which had three paved runways and an elaborate terminal (with gold-plated murals). The airport never reached capacity and saw its traffic dwindle while traffic at Love Field in Dallas continued to grow.

The April 1957 OAG lists 97 scheduled departures a day Tuesday to Thursday, more than half to nearby Dallas Love Field. American Airlines had 30, Braniff 22, Trans-Texas 19, Continental 13, Delta 7 and Central 6.

On December 20, 1959, jet service began with American Airlines Boeing 707 flights to Los Angeles. Delta Air Lines later started Convair 880 jet nonstops to Los Angeles and New Orleans. Also in 1959, Continental Airlines was operating Vickers Viscount turboprop service from the airport nonstop to Abilene, Midland/Odessa, and Lubbock, Texas, as well as direct, no change of plane Viscount flights to Albuquerque, El Paso, Santa Fe, and Clovis, NM.

In 1960, the airport was renamed Greater Southwest International Airport (GSW) in a failed attempt to attract passengers. In the same year, the city of Fort Worth purchased the airport.

In 1961, American Airlines was operating an eastbound multi-stop transcontinental flight with a Boeing 707 jetliner on a Los Angeles - Fort Worth - New Orleans - Miami routing in association with Delta Air Lines and National Airlines as an interchange transport hub service jointly operated by the three air carriers in addition to American flying a northbound service operated with a Douglas DC-6 propliner on a routing of Fort Worth - Dallas Love Field - Tulsa - St. Louis - Chicago Midway Airport - Detroit - Buffalo, NY. At this same time, American was also flying Lockheed L-188 Electra turboprop service on several routes from the airport including an eastbound service operating Fort Worth - Dallas Love Field - Washington D.C. National Airport - Philadelphia - New York City LaGuardia Airport as well as another eastbound flight operating Fort Worth - Little Rock - Memphis - New York City Idlewild Airport (now JFK Airport) - Hartford and also a northbound routing of Fort Worth - Dallas Love Field - Oklahoma City - Tulsa - St. Louis. The airline was also operating another multi-stop transcontinental flight at this time with a DC-6 operating an eastbound "milk run" routing of Los Angeles - San Diego - Phoenix - Tucson - El Paso - Fort Worth - Memphis, TN - Nashville - Knoxville - Washington D.C. National Airport - New York City LaGuardia Airport. In addition, American was operating Douglas DC-7 propliner service from the airport at this time as well including an eastbound flight operating Fort Worth - Dallas Love Field - Nashville - Louisville - Cincinnati - Columbus, OH - New York City Idlewild Airport.

== Passenger service during the mid and late 1960s ==
Several airlines were continuing to serve Greater Southwest International Airport during the mid 1960s including American Airlines, Braniff International Airways, Central Airlines, Continental Airlines, Delta Air Lines, Eastern Airlines, and Trans-Texas Airways. According to the Official Airline Guide of May 1, 1964, all seven air carriers were operating flights to Dallas Love Field with a combined total of 22 flights per day each way.

American Airlines was operating Boeing 727-100 service into Greater Southwest twice a day with a westbound flight routing of New York LaGuardia Airport - Chicago O'Hare Airport - Fort Worth - El Paso - Los Angeles and an eastbound flight routing of Los Angeles - El Paso - Fort Worth - Oklahoma City.

Braniff International also flew nonstop service between GSW and Houston Hobby Airport operated with British Aircraft Corporation BAC One-Eleven twinjets and Lockheed L-188 Electra turboprops. In 1968, Braniff International was operating a "milk run" flight serving the airport every weekday with a Lockheed L-188 Electra turboprop flying a westbound and then southbound routing of Memphis, TN - Little Rock, AR - Fort Smith, AR - Tulsa, OK - Dallas Love Field - Fort Worth - Houston Hobby Airport - Corpus Christi, TX.

Central Airlines, which was based in Fort Worth, was operating four departures per day from the airport in May of 1964 but by the summer of 1967, just one daily flight was flown with a Convair 600 turboprop on a round trip "milk run" routing of Fort Worth - Dallas Love Field - Fort Smith, AR - Fayetteville, AR - Joplin, MO - Kansas City, MO.

By the fall of 1967, Central had been acquired by and merged into the original Frontier Airlines (1950-1986) which continued to operate just one departure a day from the airport on the same round trip "milk run" routing between Fort Worth and Kansas City flown with a Convair 580 turboprop.

In the 1960s, Continental Airlines was operating nonstop Vickers Viscount turboprop service to Midland/Odessa, TX. By the late 1960s, Continental was operating Douglas DC-9-10 jet service into the airport with one flight each way on a Dallas Love Field - Fort Worth - Midland/Odessa - El Paso routing.

Delta was serving the airport during the mid 1960s with a Convair 440 twin prop "milk run" flight on a westbound routing of Charleston, SC - Columbia, SC - Atlanta - Columbus, GA - Montgomery, AL - Jackson, MS - Monroe, LA - Shreveport - Dallas Love Field - Fort Worth with this service then changing flight numbers at the airport and making the short hop back to Love Field.

In the 1960s, Eastern Airlines was operating direct, no change of plane Boeing 727-100 jet service to New Orleans, Tampa and Orlando via a first stop at Dallas Love Field.

In 1966, Trans-Texas Airways (TTa) was operating three daily departures from GSW with nonstop service to Brownwood, TX, and Dallas Love Field as well as direct one stop service to Austin, TX, and San Angelo, TX, flown with twin prop Convair 240 and Douglas DC-3 aircraft.

== Decline and closure ==
In 1964, the Federal Aviation Administration, tired of funding separate airports for both Dallas and Fort Worth, announced that it would no longer support separate airports. The Civil Aeronautics Board required the two cities to come up with a plan for a regional airport, and in 1965 a parcel of land north of Greater Southwest was selected for Dallas-Fort Worth International Airport (originally named Dallas-Fort Worth Regional Airport).

While airline traffic continued to increase at Dallas Love Field, the number of flights slumped at GSW. American Airlines, the last remaining air carrier, ceased operations at GSW at the end of 1968. Following the opening of DFW in 1974, GSW was permanently closed. The land once utilized by the airfield has since been repurposed.

== Training flight operations ==
Following the cessation of all scheduled air carrier service in the late 1960s, the airfield continued to be used for airline training flights. On May 30, 1972, Delta Air Lines Flight 9570 crashed at Greater Southwest International Airport while performing "touch and go" training landings and take offs. The federal National Transportation Safety Board (NTSB) determined that wake turbulence from another training flight, an American Airlines DC-10 widebody jetliner, had caused the Delta DC-9-14 twin jet to lose control as it neared touchdown. As this was a training flight, only four people were on board: three crew and an FAA operations inspector. All were killed.

== Redevelopment following closure ==
Following the closure of the airport, Runway 17/35 became Amon Carter Boulevard for several years before it was torn up and replaced with an actual street. As of 2022 a small section of the taxiway and run-up area of Runway 18 still exists on the north side of State Highway 183. American Airlines expanded its headquarters to new buildings on the airport site during the 1980s and 1990s (the airline's former hangar had remained in use as a reservations center for several years before it was demolished). The airport's IATA airport code, GSW, is still in use by the American Airlines Flight Academy, which sits across State Highway 360 from the airport site.
