= Time based separation =

The impact of strong headwinds on an aircraft's speed during approach results in decreasing landing rates, generating delays and cancellations at airports with a significant cost to airspace users and the travelling public.

In early 2000, EUROCONTROL started researching Time Based Separation (TBS), a new operating procedure for separating aircraft by time during strong headwind conditions, instead of distance. TBS addresses headwind disruptions by reducing the spacing between pairs of aircraft.

As wake decay is more rapid in strong headwind conditions, wake vortex is quickly dispersed permitting a safe reduction in the spacing between aircraft through TBS preserving runway throughput.

NATS joined the TBS research in SESAR and in 2014 was preparing its first deployment for spring 2015 at London Heathrow airport. Furthermore, TBS is now a part of the SESAR Deployment Programme.

Time Based Separation was successfully implemented at Heathrow by NATS and Leidos working in conjunction with Heathrow Airport on 24 March 2015 and has been in continuous operation since then. It enabled an average of 2.9 additional landings per hour on strong wind days, and delays caused by headwinds were reduced by up to 60%. In March 2018 it was further enhanced to include Optimised Runway Delivery (ORD), Runway Occupancy Time and RECAT EU Wake categories. Results have been very successful with a 62% reduction in arrival delays due to headwinds and a marked improvement in overall airport punctuality.

== Weather dependent ==
Future steps in research linked to TBS will involve Weather Dependent Separations (WDS) on arrival taking into account different parameters such as weather and wind forecasts. WDS will support an increase in runway throughput whilst TBS preserves current runway throughput.

== Related systems ==
The application of reduced separations in strong headwinds conditions requires the development of a new Air Traffic Controller support tool to optimise delivery of accurate and safe separation at the runway threshold.

== See also ==
- Wake turbulence
