= Frunzensky Airport =

Former airport in Bishkek

- IATA: none; ICAO: none

Summary
- Airport type: Defunct
- Serves: Frunze (now Bishkek)
- Location: Bishkek, Kyrgyzstan
- Opened: 1933
- Closed: October 1981
- Coordinates: 42°50′13″N 74°34′45″E
- Interactive map of Frunzensky Airport

Frunzensky Airport was an international airport located in Bishkek, Chüy Region, Kyrgyzstan. It originally served as the capital airport from 1940 until 1974, when it was replaced by Manas International Airport. It was closed in October 1981 after all flights and aircraft were transitioned.

== History ==
Initially, the site of the airport was an unplowed field in the suburban village of Papenovka. In 1933, the airport was established. Following this, Frunzensky Airport begun construction in 1940. In 1945, the government of Kyrgyzstan established an independent aviation unit at Frunzensky Airport, commanded by Lev Shiryaev. By 1946, Lisunov Li-2 pilots laid the Frunze-Moscow route, which lasted 2 days. In 1954, a 2-floor airport terminal begun construction, which was designed by architect E. G. Pisarskoy. It opened in 1957.

=== Closure ===
By the 1970s, Frunzensky Airport was too small for larger aircraft, and the city had encroached to the air terminal. It was decided that a new airport would be built 23 kilometres northwest of the capital, which was completed in nine months. On October 23, 1974, Manas International Airport opened, and the first plane to land on it was the Ilyushin Il-62 with the USSR Chairman Alexei Kosygin on board. Frunze Airport operated parallel to the new airport, however in October 1981, all flights and aircraft were transferred from Frunzensky Airport to Manas. Afterwards, it was closed, and the terminal building began to serve as the Central Air Traffic Agency (CABC).

== Present ==
On 10 November 2014, the Public Service Center was moved from an old location to the old Frunzensky Airport terminal. On 9 October 2017, the Public Service Center was moved to a new address. It originally housed the departments of passportization and registration of the population. The civil registry offices of the Oktyabrsky and Leninsky districts were also located in the terminal. On 21 December, 2023, the old air terminal was transferred to be managed by the Ministry of Internal Affairs.
