= Wake turbulence =

Turbulence that follows behind aircraft traveling through air

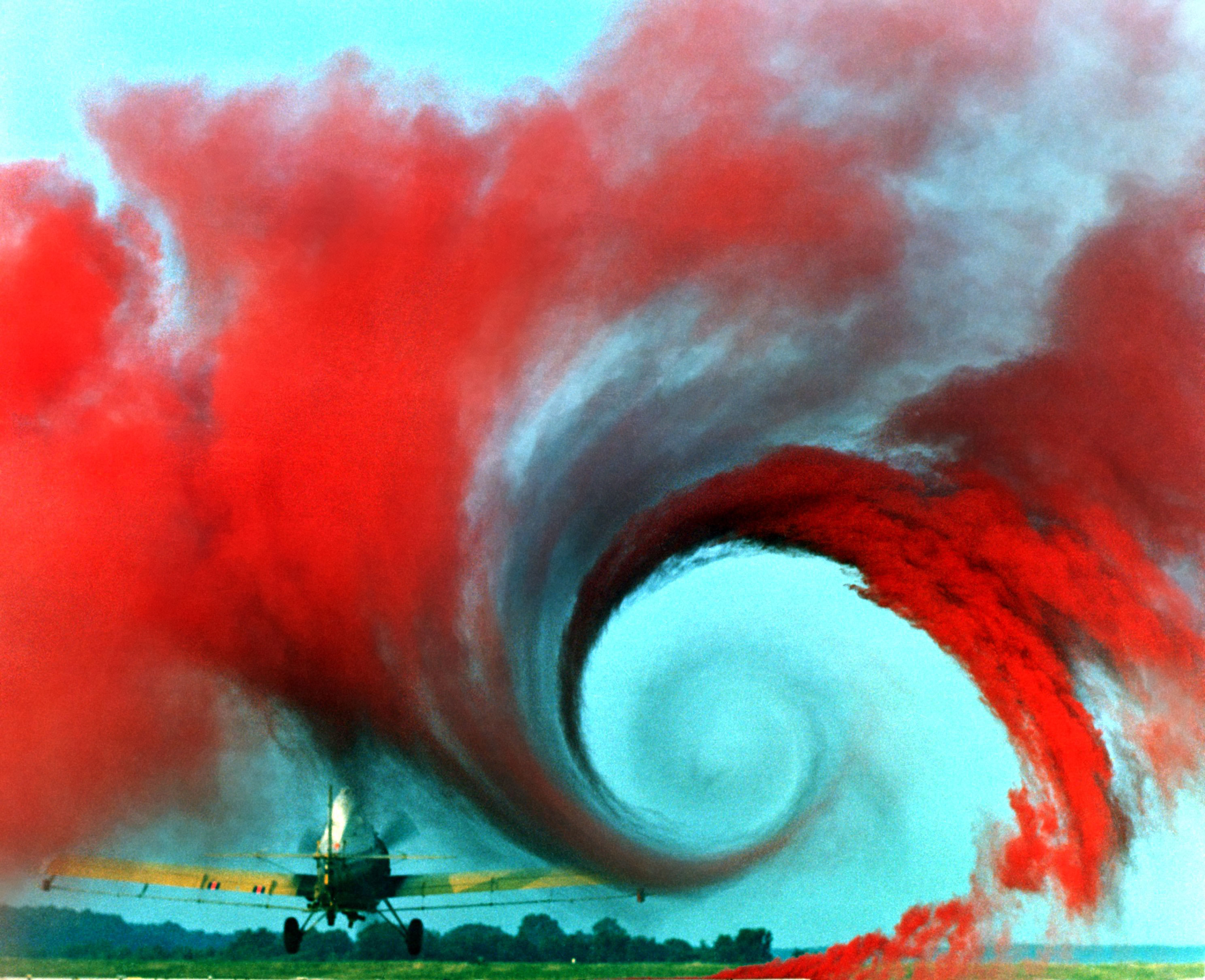
This picture from a NASA study on wingtip vortices qualitatively illustrates the wake turbulence.

Wake turbulence is a disturbance in the atmosphere that forms behind an aircraft as it passes through the air. It is primarily associated with trailing vortices generated as the aircraft produces lift, most notably wingtip vortices.

Wake turbulence is especially hazardous in the region behind an aircraft in the takeoff or landing phases of flight. During takeoff and landing, an aircraft operates at a high angle of attack. This flight attitude maximizes the formation of strong vortices. In the vicinity of an airport, there can be multiple aircraft, all operating at low speed and low altitude; this provides an extra risk of wake turbulence with a reduced height from which to recover from any upset.

== Definition ==
Wake turbulence is a type of clear-air turbulence. In the case of wake turbulence created by the wings of a heavy aircraft, the rotating vortex-pair lingers for a significant amount of time after the passage of the aircraft, sometimes more than a minute. One of these rotating vortices can impose rolling moments that may exceed the roll-control authority of a smaller encountering aircraft, potentially resulting in loss of control.

=== In fixed-wing level flight ===
The vortex circulation is outward, upward, and around the wingtips when viewed from either ahead or behind the aircraft. Tests with large aircraft have shown that vortices remain spaced less than a wingspan apart, drifting with the wind, at altitudes greater than a wingspan from the ground. Tests have also shown that the vortices sink at a rate of several hundred feet per minute, slowing their descent and diminishing in strength with time and distance behind the generating aircraft.

At altitude, vortices sink at a rate of 90–150 m (300–490 ft) per minute and stabilize about 150–270 m (490–890 ft) below the flight level of the generating aircraft. Therefore, aircraft operating at altitudes greater than 600 m (2,000 ft) are considered to be at less risk.

When the vortices of larger aircraft sink close to the ground — within 100–200 ft (30–61 m) — they tend to move laterally over the ground at a speed of 2–3 kn (3.7–5.6 km/h; 2.3–3.5 mph). A crosswind decreases the lateral movement of the upwind vortex and increases the movement of the downwind vortex.

=== Helicopters ===
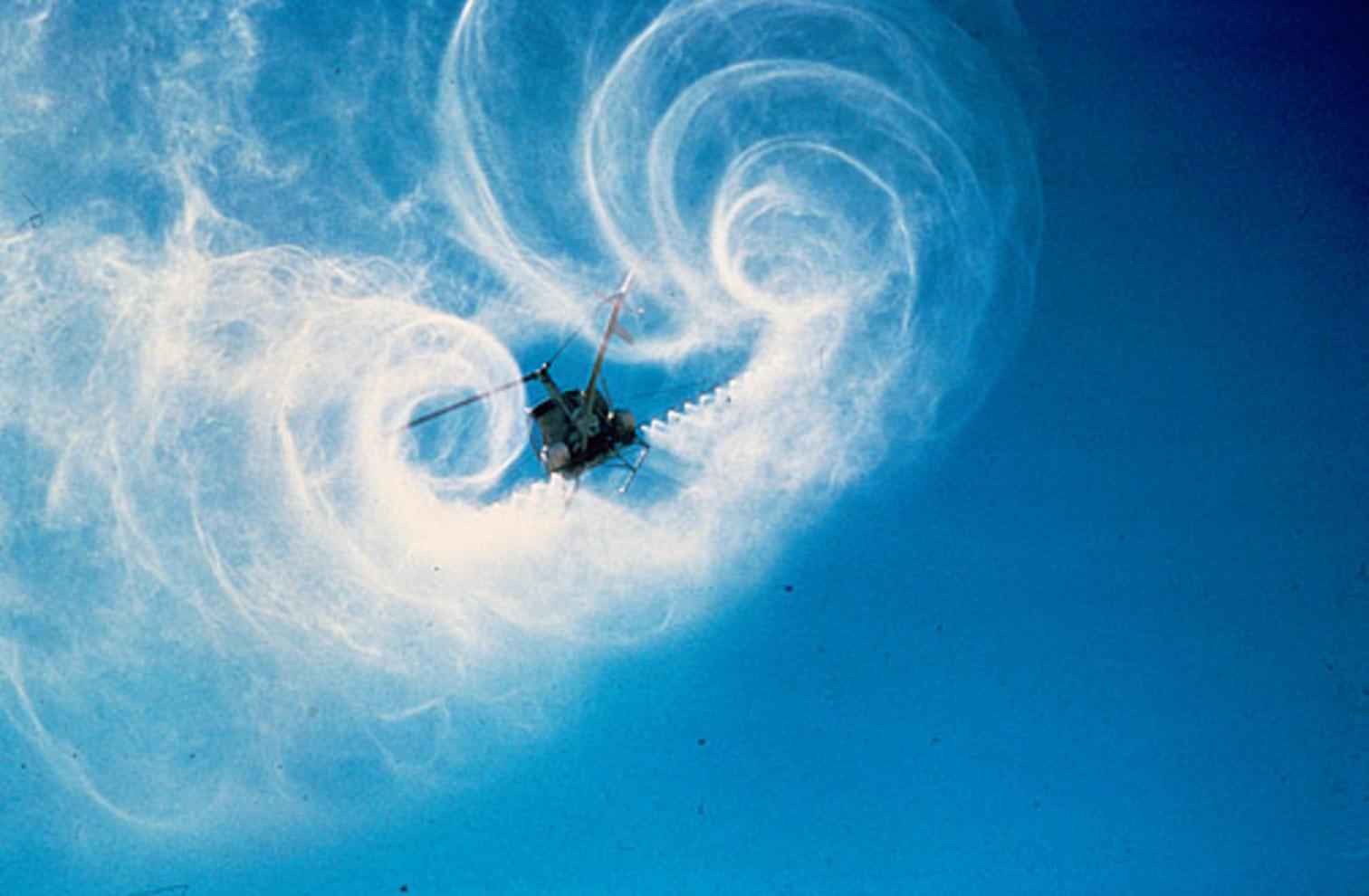
Wake generated by a helicopter spraying in flight

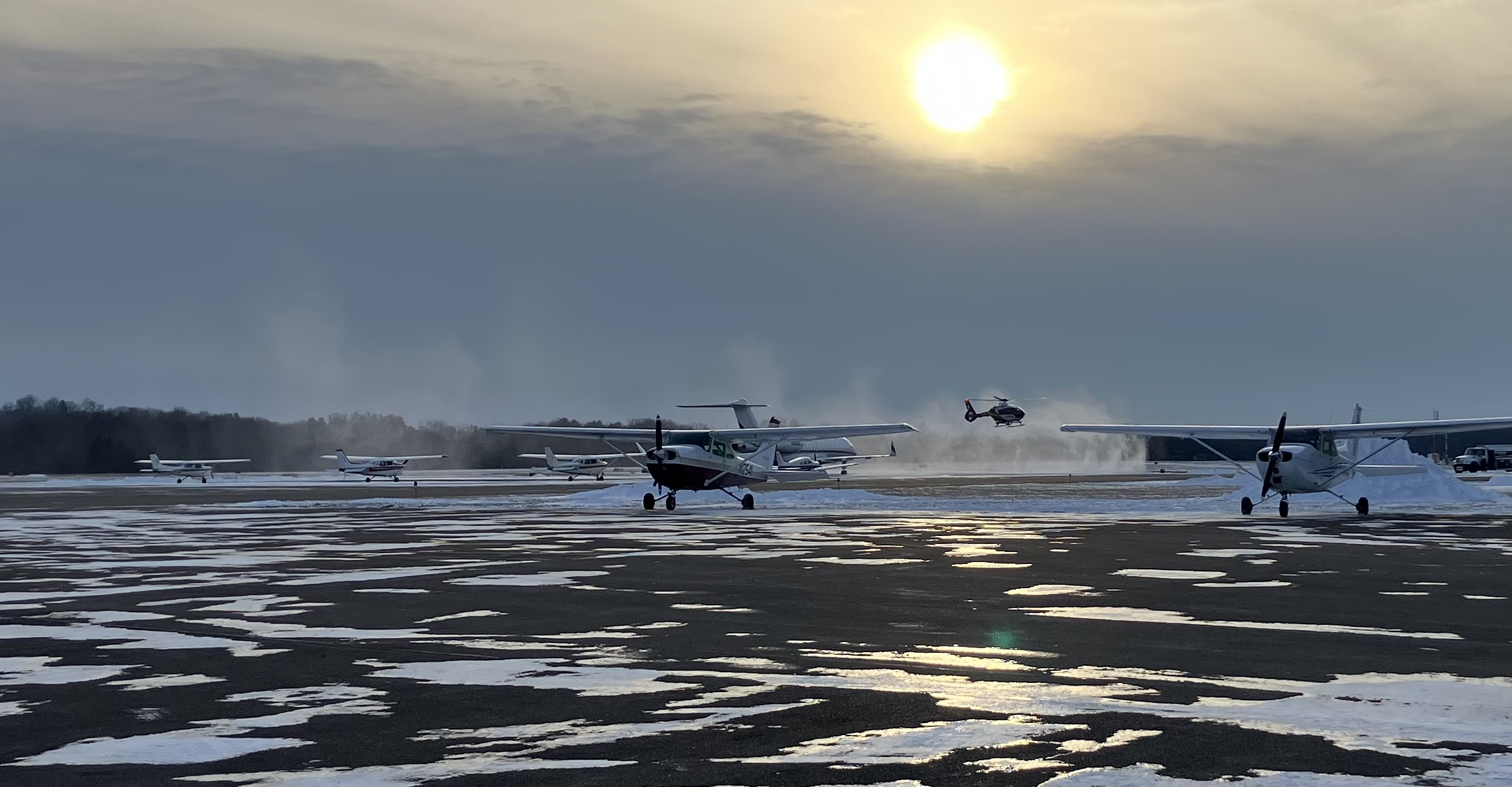
A helicopter taxiing to its parking area and blowing up loose snow into the air

Helicopters also produce wake turbulence. Helicopter wakes may be significantly stronger than those of a fixed-wing aircraft of the same weight. The strongest wake will occur when the helicopter is operating at slower speeds (20 to 50 knots). Light helicopters with two-blade rotor systems produce a wake as strong as heavier helicopters with more than two blades. The rotor wake of the Bell Boeing V-22 Osprey can be hazardous; a United States Air Force accident investigation of a 2012 CV-22B crash attributed the accident to a failure to maintain wake separation from another CV-22B during formation manoeuvring.

== Hazard avoidance ==
Wingtip devices may slightly lessen the power of wingtip vortices. However, such changes are not significant enough to change the distances or times at which it is safe to follow other aircraft.

=== Wake turbulence categories ===
ICAO mandates wake turbulence categories based upon the maximum takeoff weight (MTOW) of the aircraft. These are used for separation of aircraft during take-off and landing.

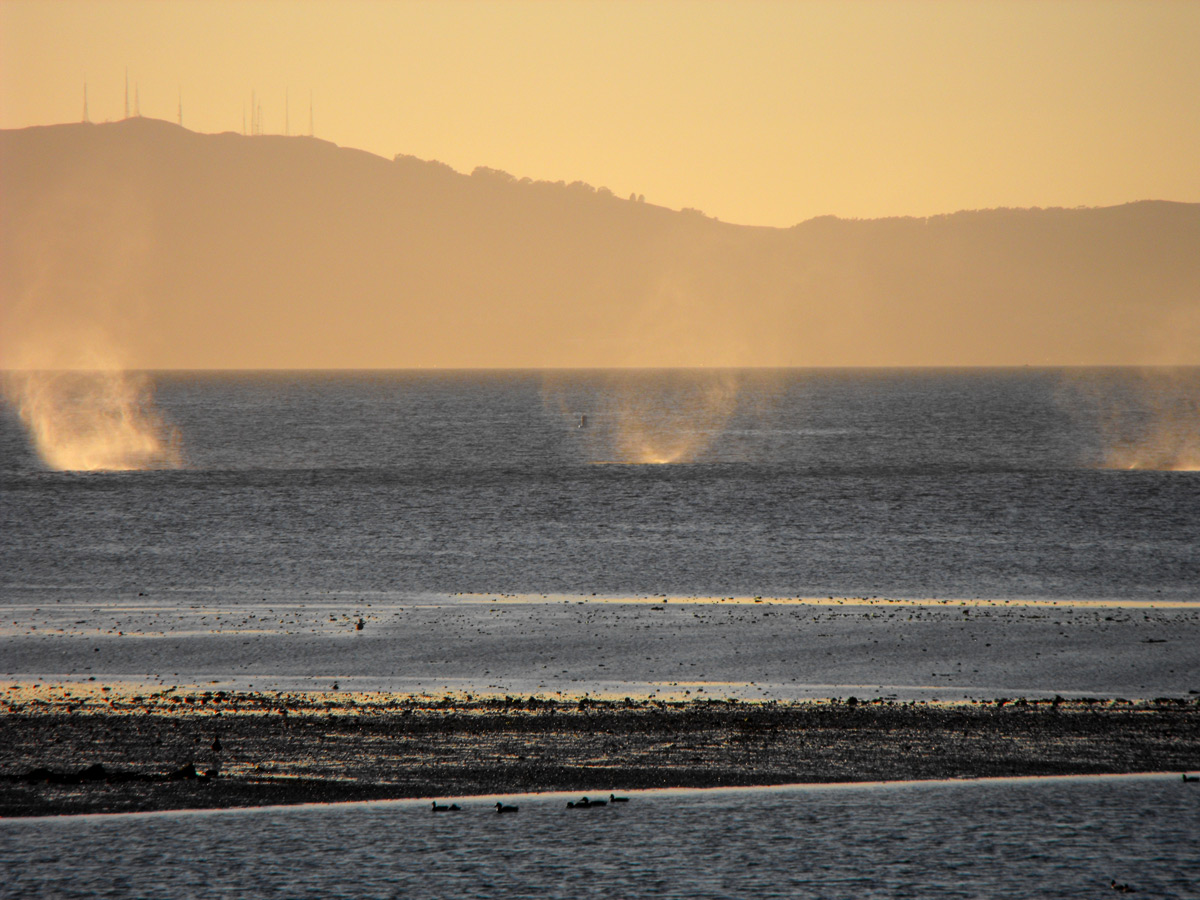
Wake vortices from a landing Airbus at Oakland International Airport interact with the sea as they descend to ground level.

There are a number of separation criteria for take-off, landing, and en-route phases of flight based upon wake turbulence categories. Air Traffic Controllers will sequence aircraft making instrument approaches with regard to these criteria. The aircraft making a visual approach is advised of the relevant recommended spacing and are expected to maintain their separation.

=== Parallel or crossing runways ===
During takeoff and landing, an aircraft's wake sinks toward the ground and moves laterally away from the runway when the wind is calm. A three-to-five-knot (3.5 to 5.8 mph; 5.6 to 9.3 km/h) crosswind will tend to keep the upwind side of the wake in the runway area and may cause the downwind side to drift toward another runway. Since the wingtip vortices exist at the outer edge of an airplane's wake, this can be dangerous.

=== Staying at or above the leader's glide path ===
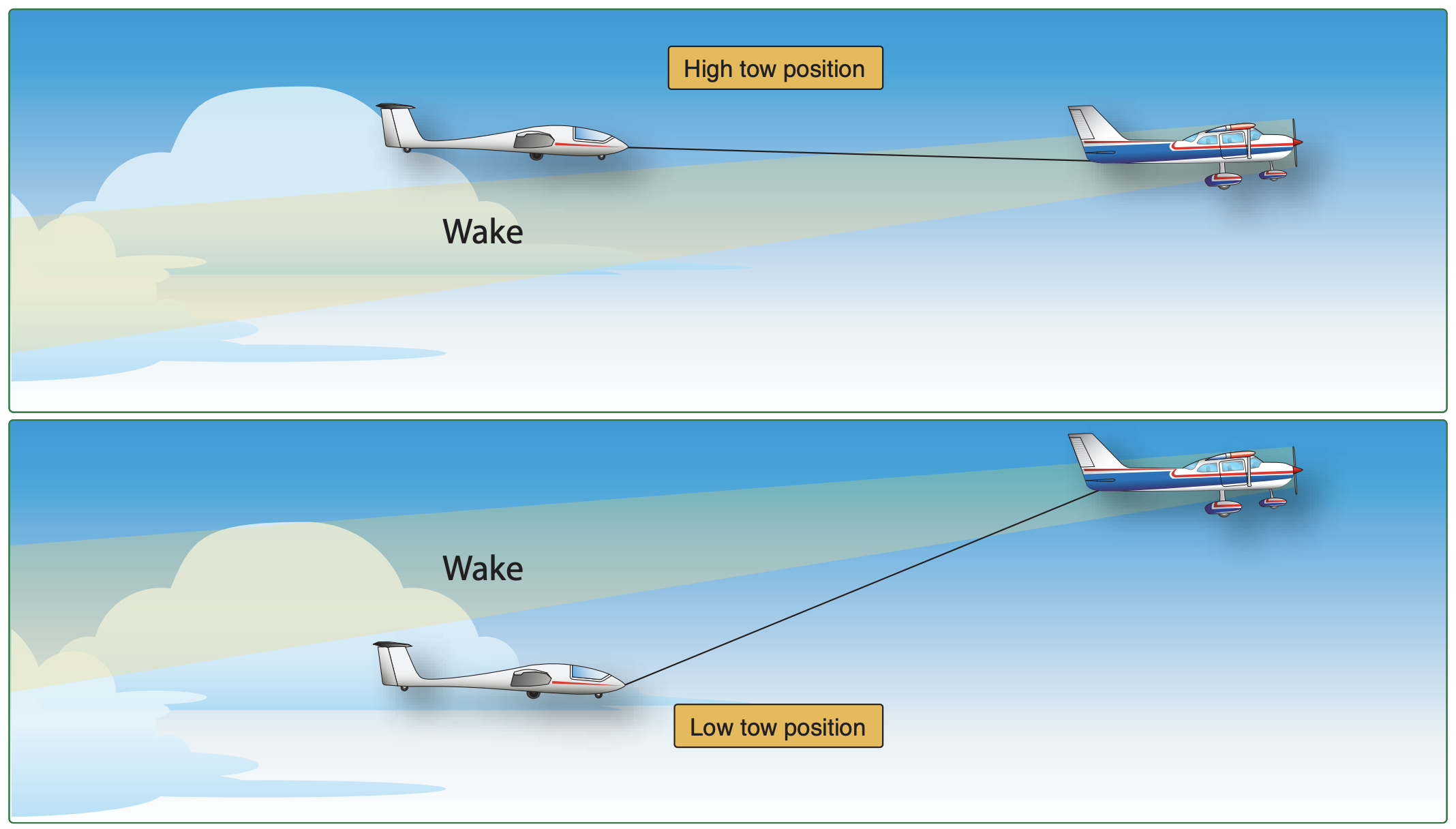
Glider pilots usually fly outside the wake turbulence generated by their tow planes, either above the wake (high tow) or below the wake (low tow).

=== Warning signs ===
Wake turbulence encounters commonly present as induced rolling and/or pitching moments, and may be difficult for pilots to distinguish from turbulence generated by other sources. The hazard is greatest at low altitude during take-off and landing, where there is less height available for recovery.

When wake turbulence is suspected, avoidance is primarily achieved by adjusting the flight path to remain clear of the area behind and below the generating aircraft, including small changes in altitude or lateral position (preferably upwind) to exit the vortex region. On approach, discontinuing the landing attempt and executing a go-around is an available option for avoiding a developing or suspected wake encounter.

=== Plate lines ===
In 2020, researchers looked into installing "plate lines" near the runway threshold to induce secondary vortices and shorten the vortex duration. In the trial installation at Vienna International Airport, they reported a 22%–37% vortex reduction.

== Incidents involving wake turbulence ==
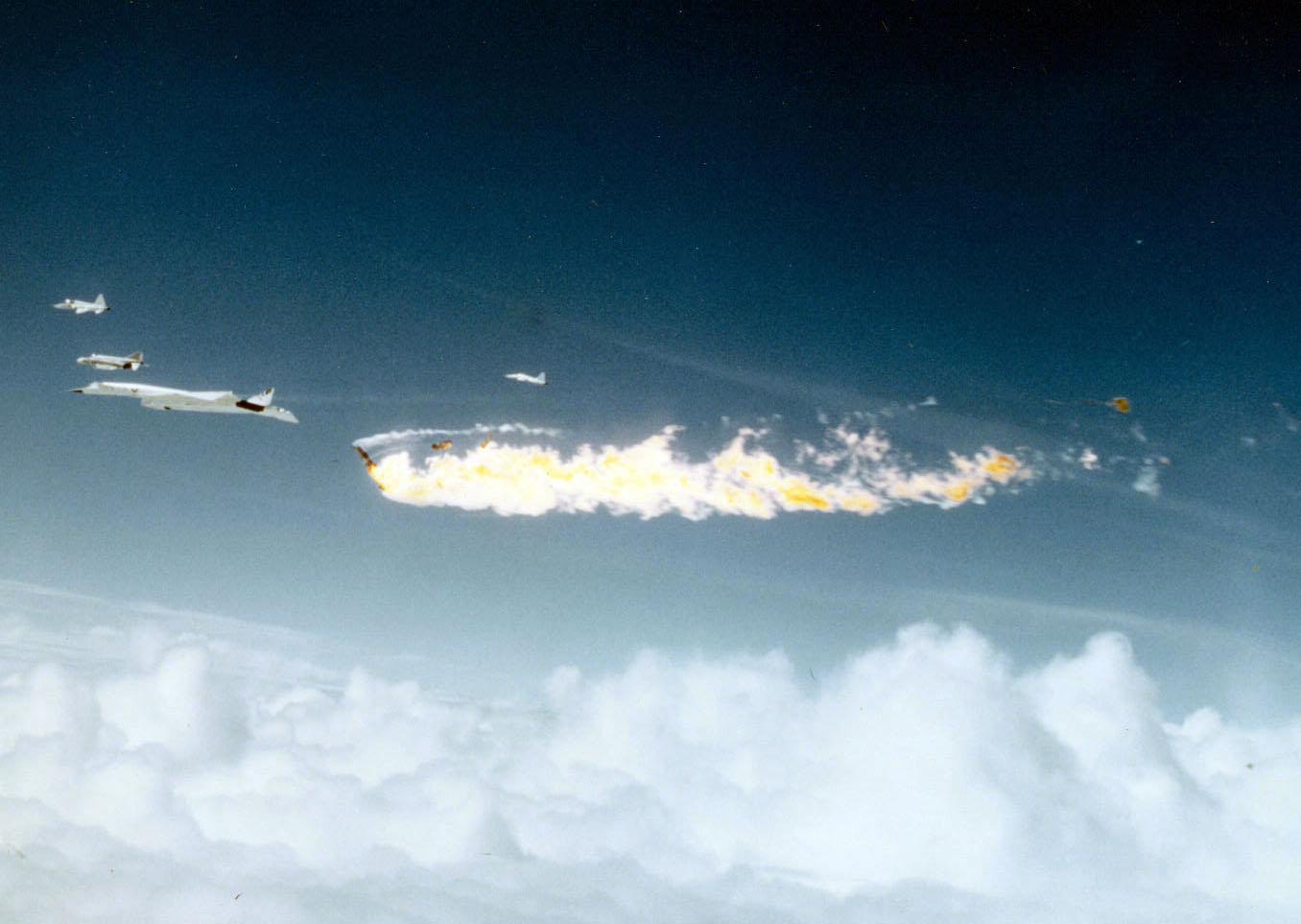
XB-70 62-0207 following the midair collision on 8 June 1966.

- 8 June 1966 – an XB-70 collided with an F-104. Though the true cause of the collision is unknown, it is believed that due to the XB-70 being designed to have enhanced wake turbulence to increase lift, the F-104 moved too close, therefore getting caught in the vortex and colliding with the wing (see main article).
- 30 May 1972 – A DC-9 crashed at the Greater Southwest International Airport while performing "touch and go" landings behind a DC-10. This crash prompted the FAA to create new rules for minimum following separation from "heavy" aircraft.
- 16 January 1987 – A Yakovlev Yak-40 crashed just after take-off in Tashkent. The flight took off just one minute fifteen seconds after an Ilyushin Il-76, thus encountering its wake vortex. The Yakovlev Yak-40 then banked sharply to the right, struck the ground, and caught fire. All nine people on board Aeroflot Flight 505 died.
- 6 February 1991 – A Boeing KC-135E Stratotanker, registered as 58-0013, suffered an accident when two out of the four engines detached from the aircraft due to severe wake turbulence from another KC-135 and from high winds. The pilots managed to execute an emergency at Prince Abdullah Air Base, Saudi Arabia, saving all four crew members onboard.
- 15 December 1993 – A chartered IAI Westwind business jet with five people on board, including In-N-Out Burger President Rich Snyder, crashed several miles before John Wayne Airport in Orange County, California, killing everyone onboard. The aircraft was following a Boeing 757 for landing when it became caught in its wake turbulence, rolled into a deep descent, and crashed. As a result of this and other incidents involving aircraft following behind a Boeing 757, the FAA now employs the separation rules of heavy aircraft for the Boeing 757.
- 20 September 1999 – A JAS 39A Gripen from Airwing F 7 Såtenäs crashed into Lake Vänern in Sweden during an air combat maneuvering exercise. After passing through the wake vortex of the other aircraft, the Gripen abruptly changed course. Before the Gripen impacted the ground, the pilot ejected from the aircraft and landed safely by parachute in the lake.
- 12 November 2001 – American Airlines Flight 587 crashed into the Belle Harbor neighbourhood of Queens, New York, shortly after takeoff from John F. Kennedy International Airport. The accident was attributed to the first officer's misuse of the rudder in response to wake turbulence from a Japan Airlines Boeing 747, resulting in the overstressing and separation of the vertical stabiliser.
- 8 July 2008 – A United States Air Force PC-12 trainer crashed at Hurlburt Field, Fla., when the pilot tried to land too closely behind a larger AC-130U Spooky gunship and was caught in the gunship's wake turbulence. Air Force rules require at least a two-minute separation between slow-moving heavy planes like the AC-130U and small, light planes, but the PC-12 trailed the gunship by only about 40 seconds. As the PC-12 hit the wake turbulence, it suddenly rolled to the left and began to turn upside down. The instructor pilot stopped the roll, but before he could get the plane upright, the left wing struck the ground, sending the plane skidding 669 ft (204 m) across a field before stopping on a paved overrun.
- 3 November 2008 – The wake turbulence of an Airbus A380-800 caused temporary loss of control to a Saab 340 on approach to a parallel runway during high crosswind conditions.
- 4 November 2008 – In the 2008 Mexico City plane crash, a Learjet 45 carrying Mexican Interior Secretary Juan Camilo Mouriño crashed near Paseo de la Reforma Avenue when turning for final approach to runway 05R at Mexico City International Airport. The airplane was flying behind a 767-300 and above a heavy helicopter. According to the Mexican government, the pilots were not told about the type of plane that was approaching before them, nor did they reduce to minimum approach speed.
- 9 September 2012 – A Robin DR 400 crashed after rolling 90 degrees in wake turbulence induced by the preceding Antonov An-2. Three were killed and one was severely injured.
- 28 March 2014 – An Indian Air Force C-130J-30 KC-3803 crashed near Gwalior, India, killing all five personnel aboard.The aircraft was conducting low level penetration training by flying at around 300 ft (90 m) when it ran into wake turbulence from another C-130J aircraft that was leading the formation, causing it to crash.
- 7 January 2017 – A private Bombardier Challenger 604 rolled three times in midair and dropped 10,000 ft (3,000 m) after encountering wake turbulence when it passed 1,000 ft (300 m) under an Airbus A380 over the Arabian Sea. Several passengers were injured, one seriously. Due to the G-forces experienced, the plane was damaged beyond repair and was consequently written off.
- 14 June 2018 – At 11:29 pm, Qantas passenger flight QF94, en route from Los Angeles to Melbourne, suffered a sudden freefall over the ocean after lift-off as a result of an intense wake vortex. The event lasted for about ten seconds, according to the passengers. The turbulence was caused by the wake of the previous Qantas flight QF12, which had departed only two minutes before flight QF94.

== Measurement ==
Wake turbulence can be measured using several techniques. Currently, ICAO recognizes two methods of measurement, sound tomography, and a high-resolution technique, the Doppler lidar, a solution now commercially available. Techniques using optics can use the effect of turbulence on refractive index (optical turbulence) to measure the distortion of light that passes through the turbulent area and indicate the strength of that turbulence.

== Audibility ==
Airplane flyover followed by wake turbulence
A subtle rustling and cracking sound caused by the wake vortices after airplane flyover. It starts at 0'50 and lasts to the end of the recording.

Wake turbulence can occasionally, under the right conditions, be heard by ground observers. On a still day, the wake turbulence from heavy jets on landing approach can be heard as a dull roar or whistle. This is the strong core of the vortex. If the aircraft produces a weaker vortex, the breakup will sound like tearing a piece of paper. Often, it is first noticed some seconds after the direct noise of the passing aircraft has diminished. The sound then gets louder. Nevertheless, being highly directional, wake turbulence sound is easily perceived as originating a considerable distance behind the aircraft, its apparent source moving across the sky just as the aircraft did. It can persist for 30 seconds or more, continually changing timbre, sometimes with swishing and cracking notes, until it finally dies away.

== In popular culture ==
In the 1986 film Top Gun, Lieutenant Pete "Maverick" Mitchell, played by Tom Cruise, suffers two flameouts caused by passing through the jetwash of another aircraft, piloted by fellow aviator Tom "Ice Man" Kazansky (played by Val Kilmer). As a result, he is put into an unrecoverable spin and is forced to eject, killing his RIO Nick "Goose" Bradshaw. In a subsequent incident, he is caught in an enemy fighter's jetwash, but manages to recover safely.

In the movie Pushing Tin, air traffic controllers stand just off the threshold of a runway while an aircraft lands in order to experience wake turbulence firsthand. However, the film dramatically exaggerates the effect of turbulence on persons standing on the ground, showing the protagonists being blown about by the passing aircraft. In reality, the turbulence behind and below a landing aircraft is too gentle to knock over a person standing on the ground. (In contrast, jet blast from an aircraft taking off can be extremely dangerous to people standing behind the aircraft.)

== See also ==
- Batchelor vortex
- Eddy (fluid dynamics)
- Wake (of boats)
- Wingtip device
