= Yakovlev Yak-40 =

Soviet trijet airliner made by Yakovlev

Yak-40
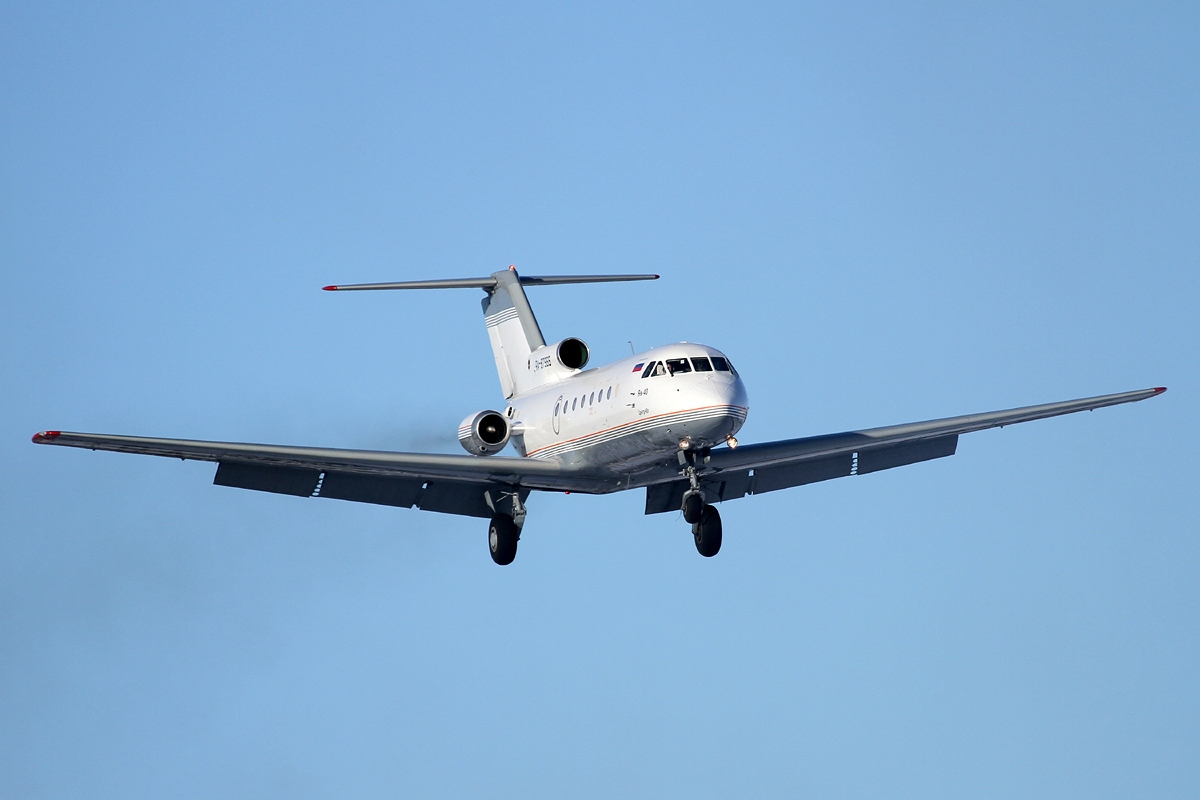
- A Yak-40 on final approach

General information
- Type: Regional jet/ VIP transport
- National origin: Soviet Union
- Manufacturer: Yakovlev
- Status: In limited service
- Primary users: Motor Sich Airlines Vologda Aviation Enterprise; Aeroflot (former)
- Number built: 1,011 (according to some sources, 1,013)

History
- Manufactured: 1967–1981
- Introduction date: September 1968 (Aeroflot)
- First flight: October 21, 1966
- Developed into: Yakovlev Yak-42

The Yakovlev Yak-40 (Russian: Яковлев Як-40; NATO reporting name: Codling) is a regional jet designed in Soviet Union by Yakovlev. The trijet's maiden flight was in 1966, and it was in production from 1967 to 1981. It was introduced to service in 1968, with export models following in 1970.

== Development ==
By the early 1960s, Soviet international and internal trunk routes were served by Aeroflot, the state airline, using jet or turboprop powered airliners, but their local services, many of which operated from grass airfields, were served by obsolete piston-engine aircraft such as the Ilyushin Il-12, Il-14 and Lisunov Li-2. Aeroflot wanted to replace these elderly airliners with a turbine-powered aircraft, with the Yakovlev design bureau being assigned to design it. High speed was not required, but it would have to be able to operate safely and reliably out of poorly equipped airports with short (less than 700 m or 2,300 ft) unpaved runways in poor weather.

Yakovlev studied both turboprop and jet-powered designs to meet the requirement, including Vertical Take-Off and Landing designs with lift jets in the fuselage or in wing-mounted pods, but eventually they settled on a straight-winged tri-jet carrying 20 to 25 passengers. The engines were to be the new AI-25 turbofan being developed by Ivchenko at Zaporizhzhia in Ukraine.

== Design ==
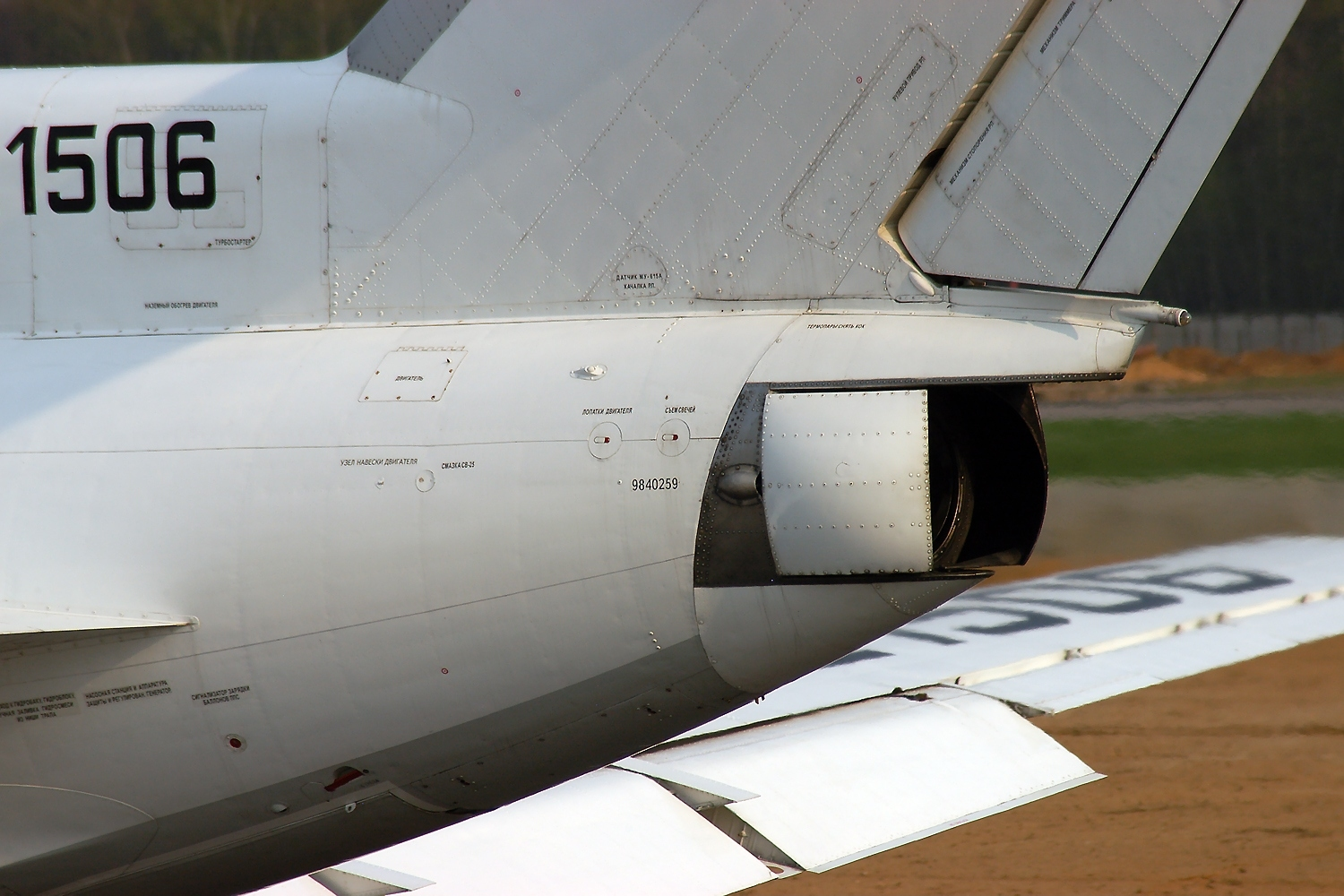
Bucket thrust reverser on the center engine

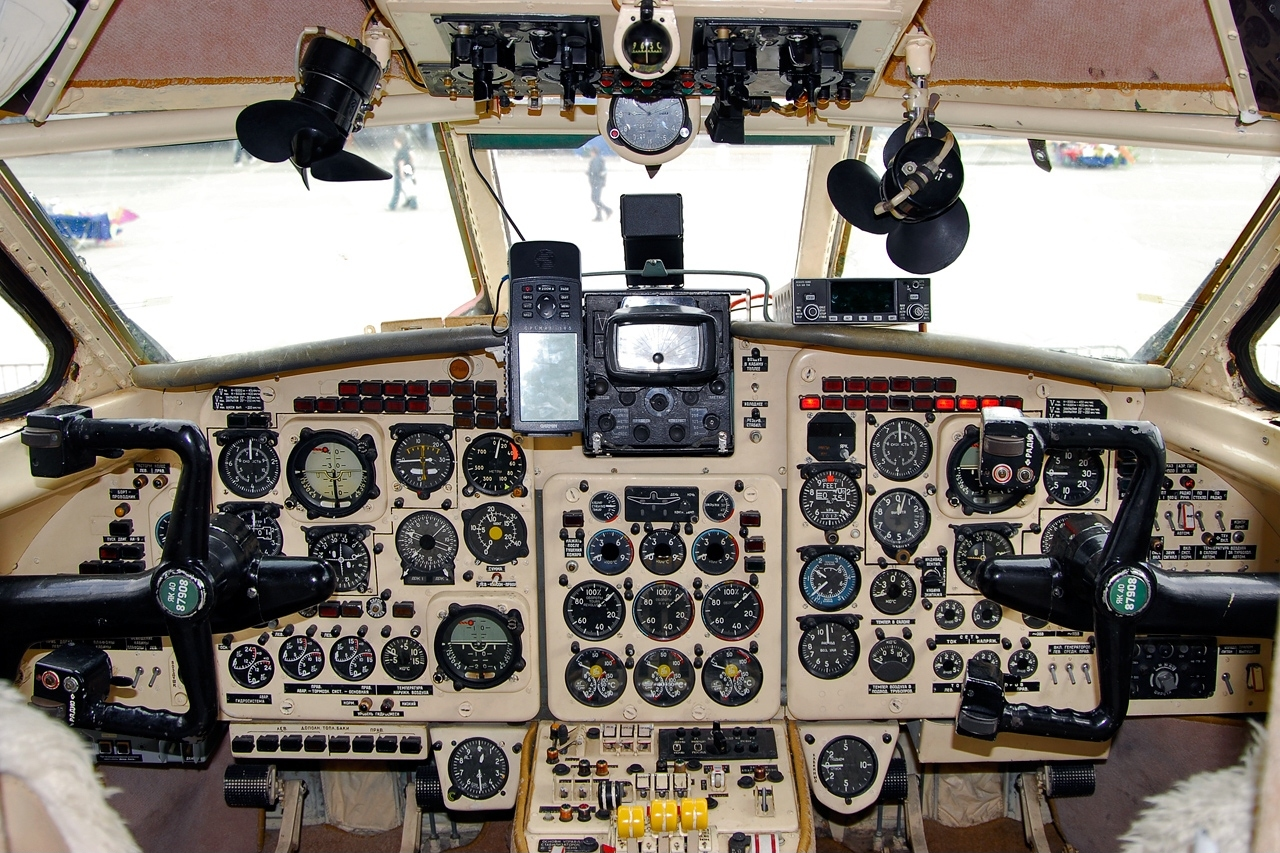
Cockpit of a Yak-40

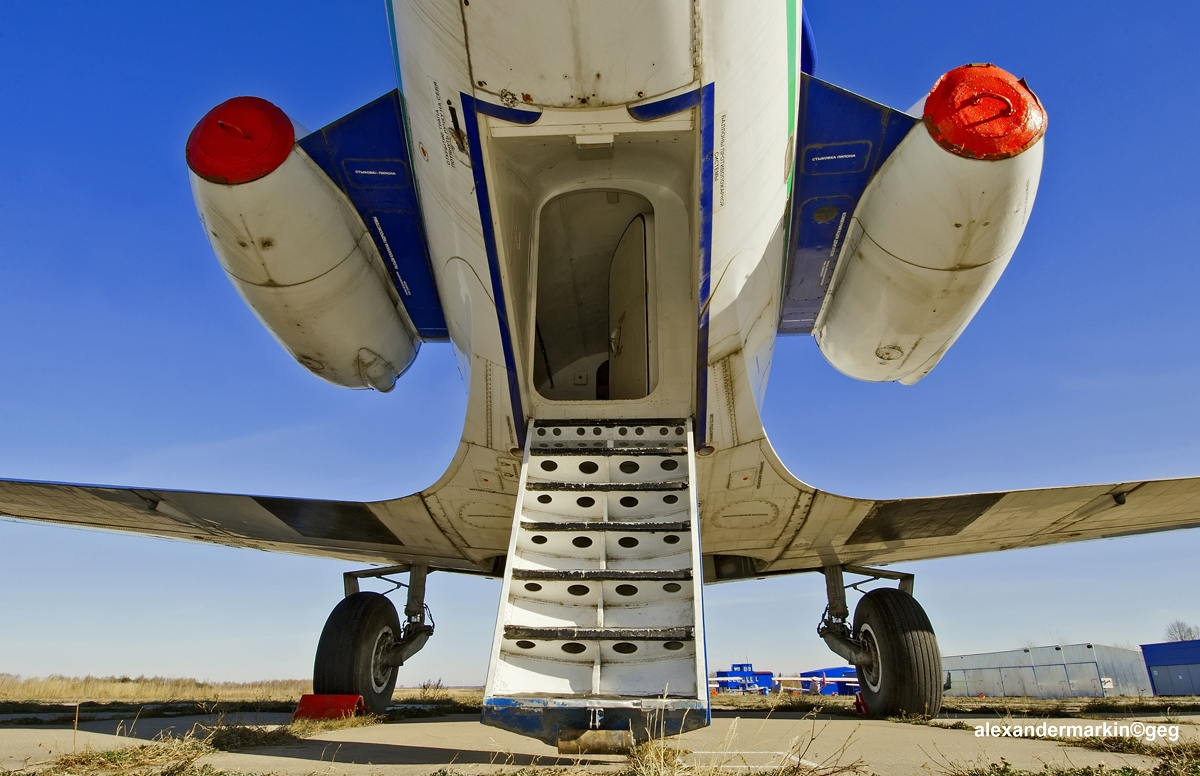
Rear view of the aircraft, showing the rear integrated airstairs

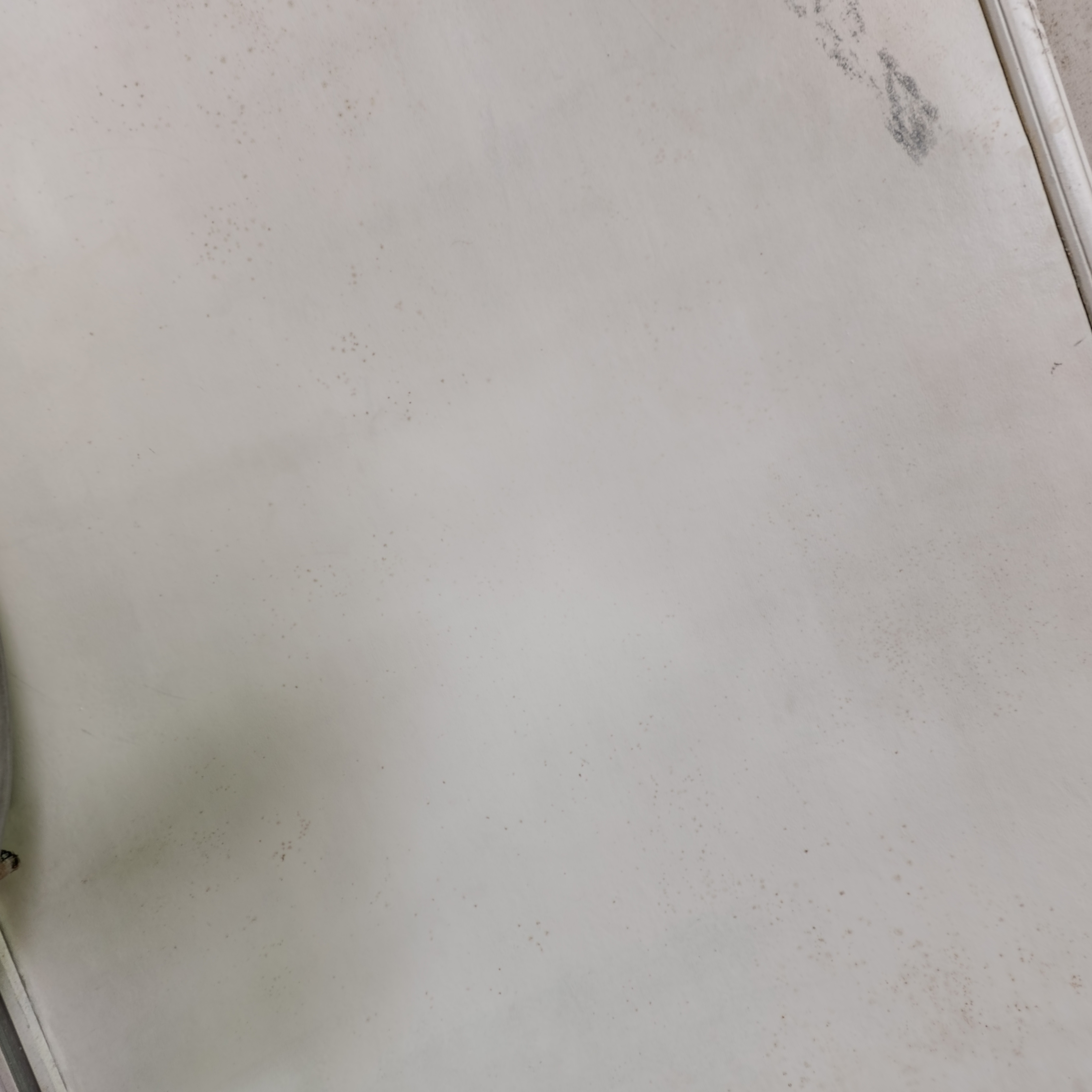
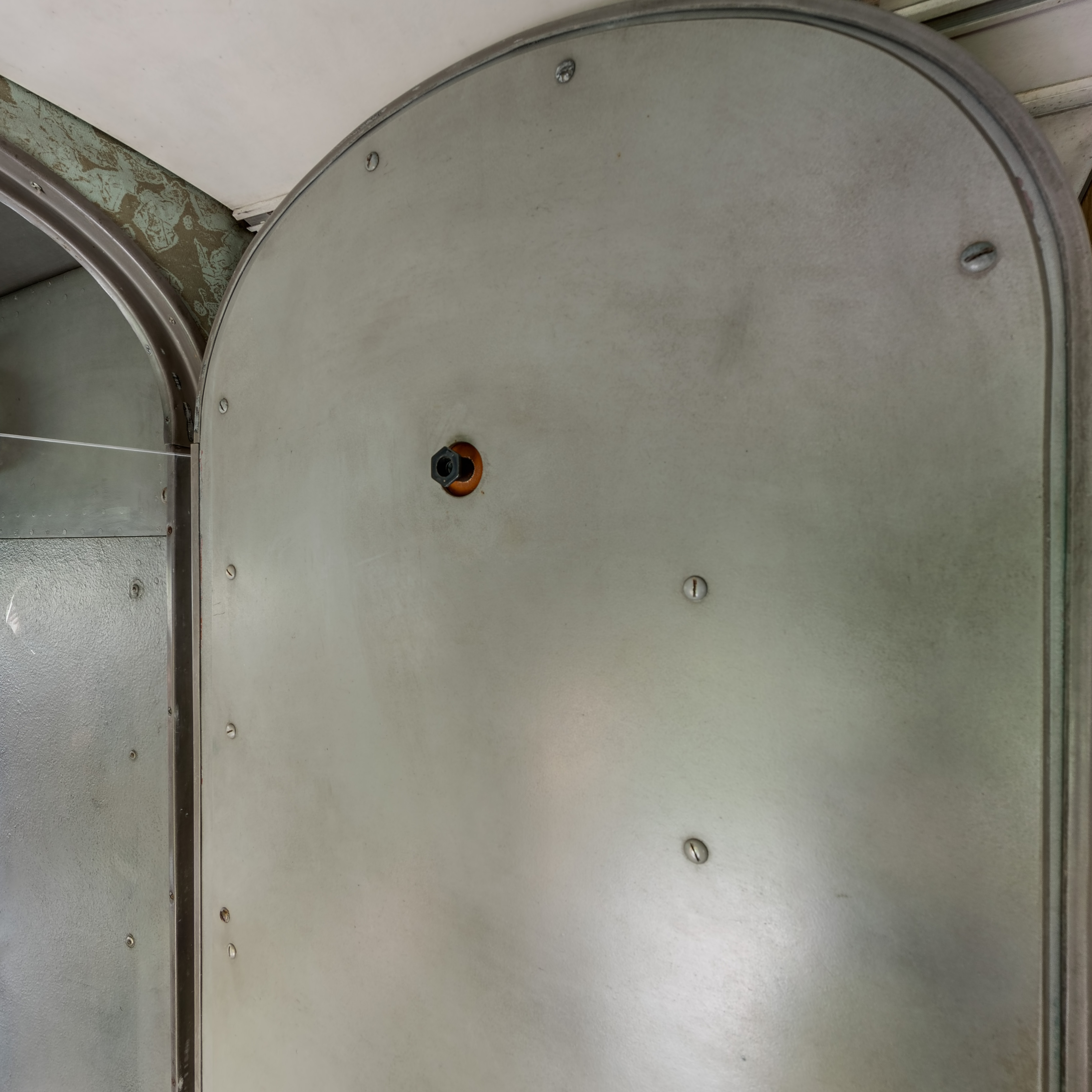
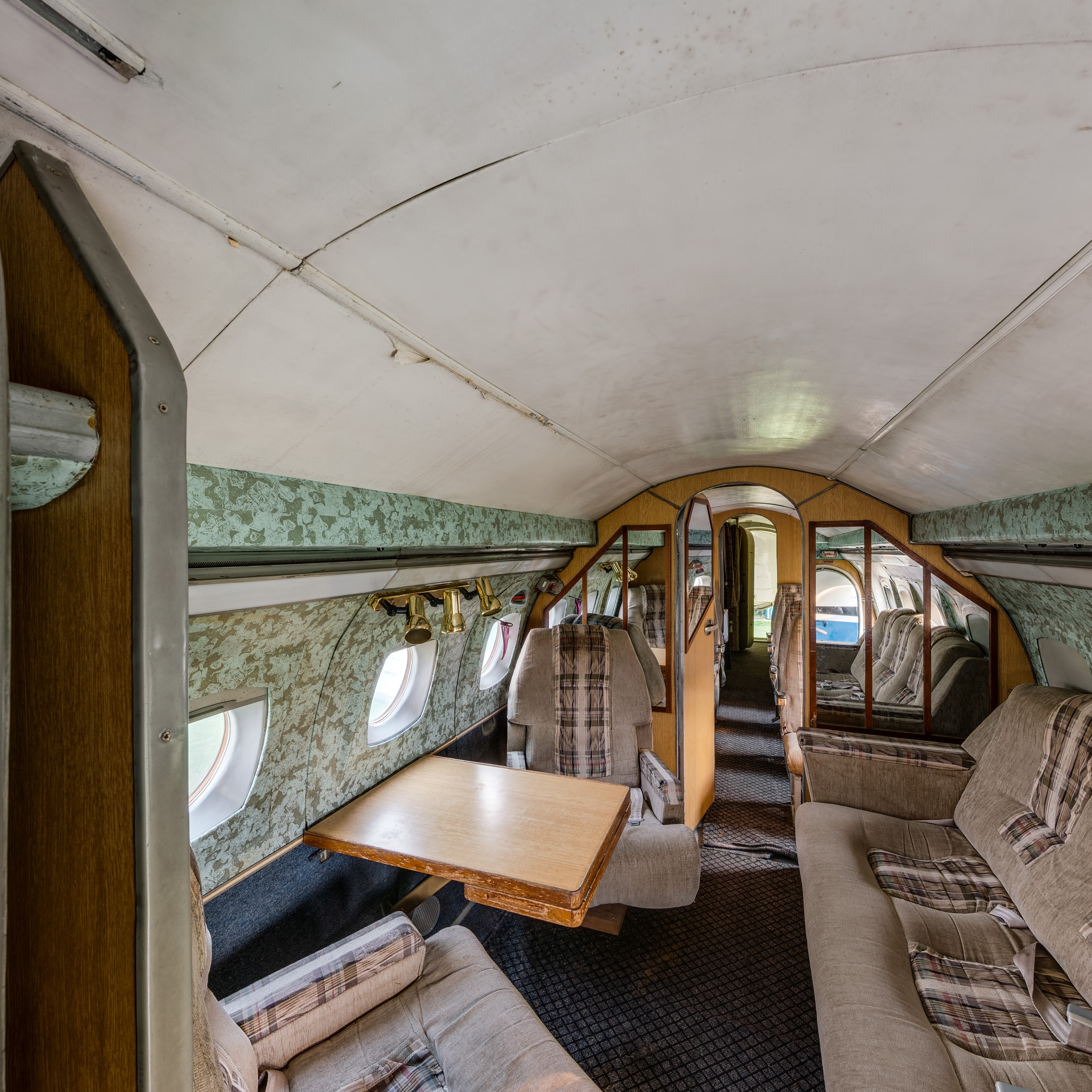
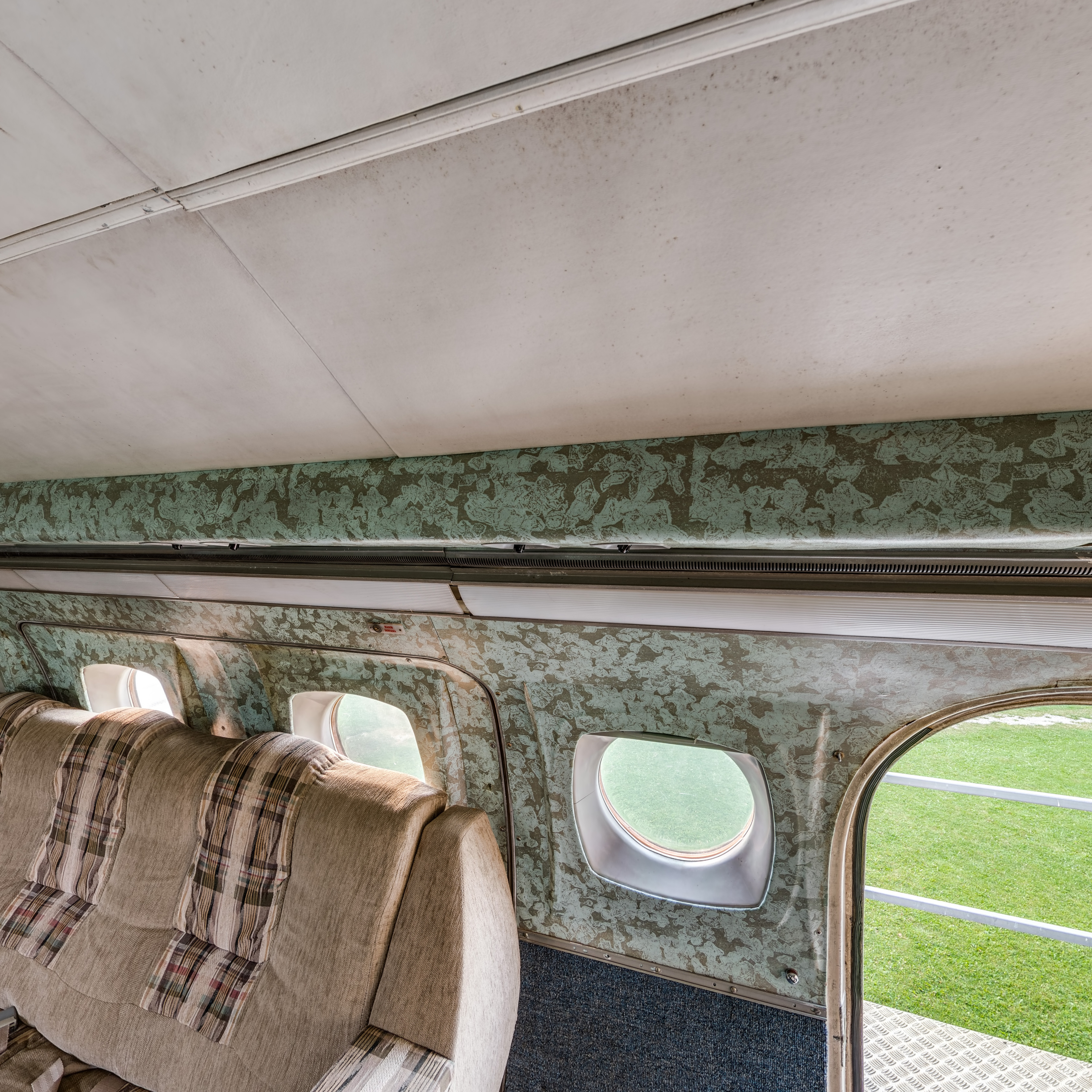
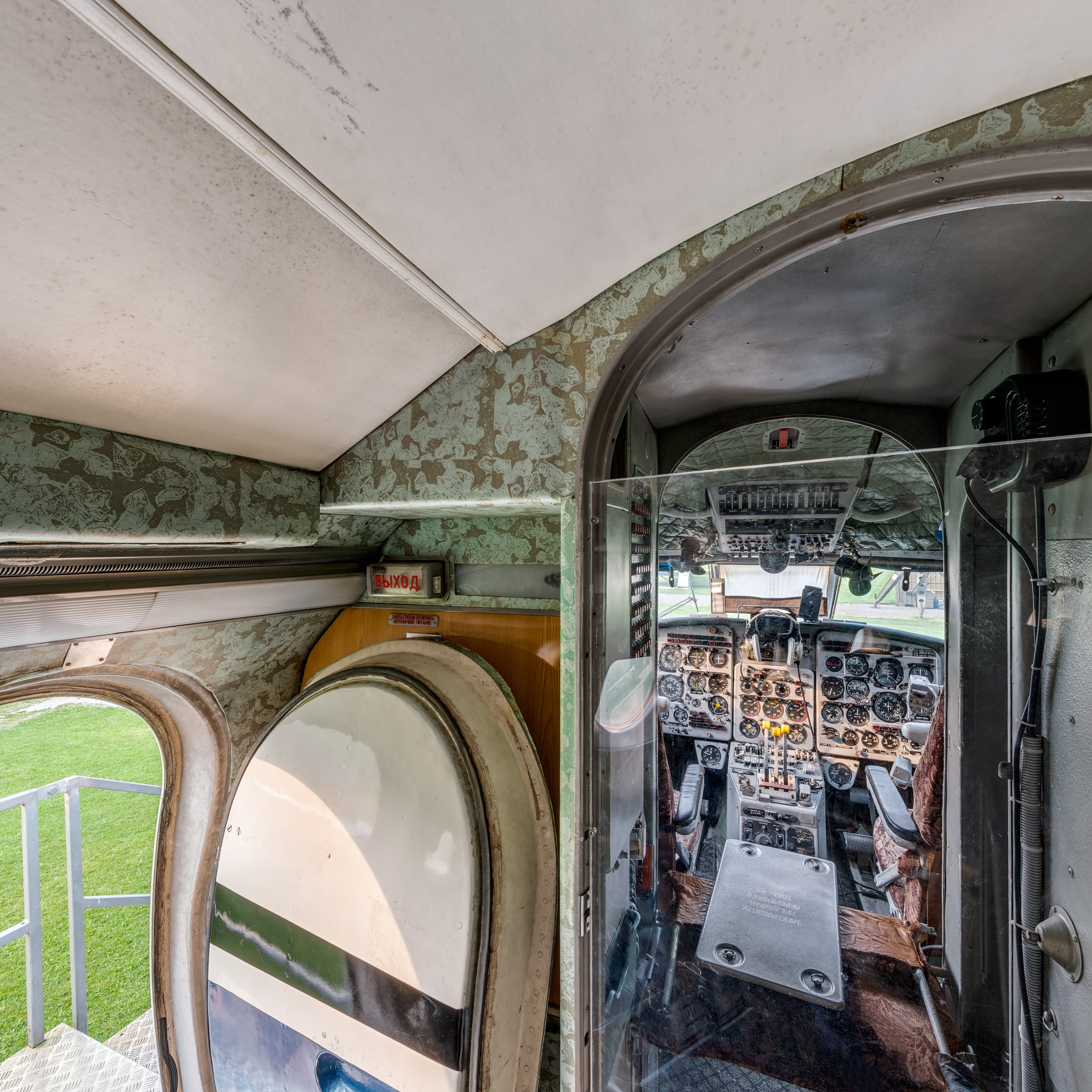
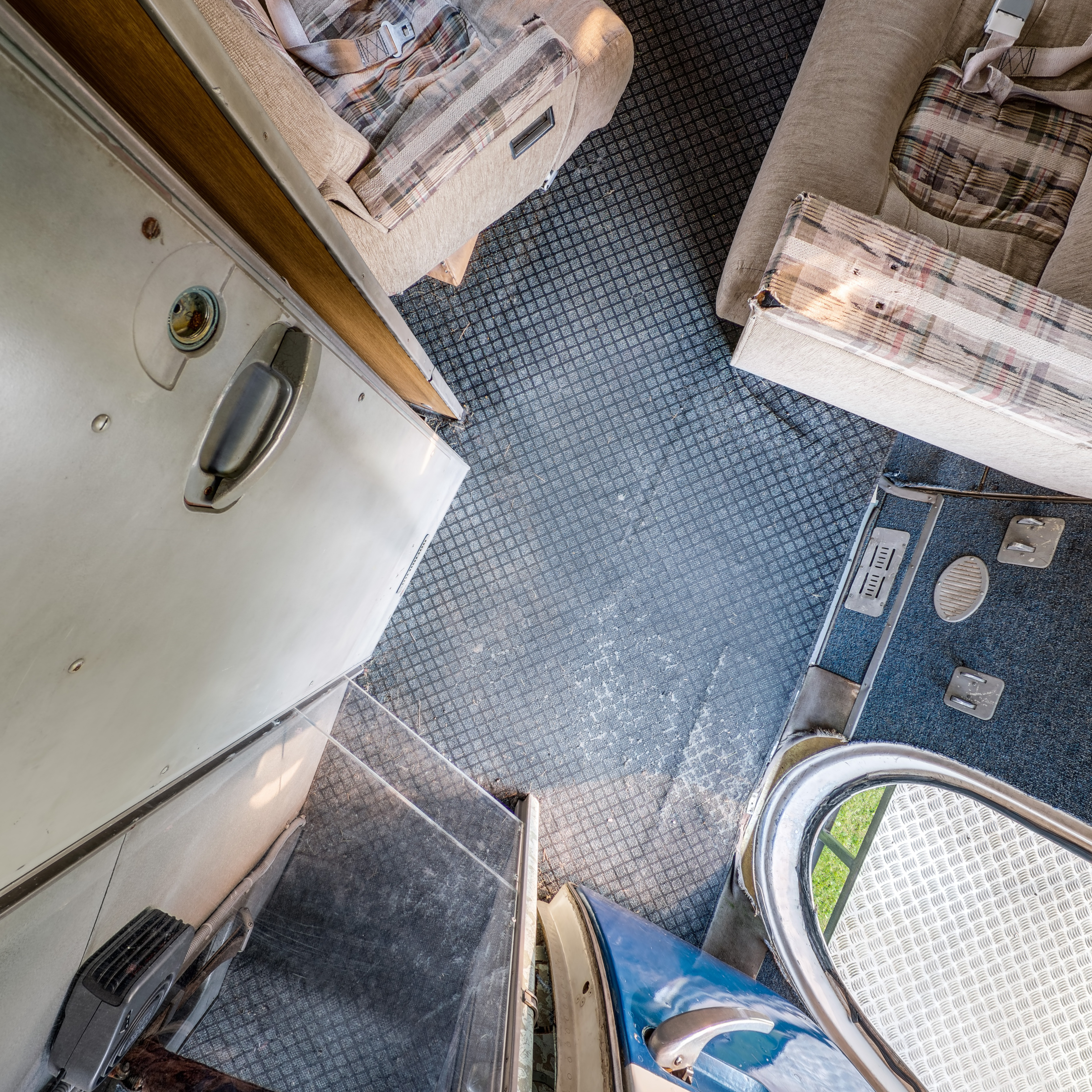
Interior photosphere of the VIP variant of the Yak-40, located at the Estonian Aviation Museum.

The Yak-40 is a low-winged cantilever monoplane with unswept wings, a large T-tail and a retractable tricycle landing gear. The passenger cabin is ahead of the wing, with the short rear fuselage carrying the three turbofan engines, with two engines mounted on short pylons on the side of the fuselage and a third engine in the rear fuselage, with air fed from a dorsal air-intake by an "S-duct", as is an auxiliary power unit, fitted to allow engine start-up without ground support on primitive airfields. The three AI-25 engines are two-shaft engines rated at 14.7 kN (3,300 lbf). The engines have no jetpipes, and initially no thrust reversers.

The pressurized fuselage has a diameter of 2.4 metres (94 in). Pilot and co-pilot sit side by side in the aircraft's flight deck, while the passenger cabin has a standard layout seating 24 to 27 passengers three-abreast, although 32 passengers can be carried by switching to four-abreast seating. Passengers enter the aircraft via a set of ventral airstairs in the rear fuselage.

The wing is fitted with large trailing-edge slotted flaps, but has no other high-lift devices, relying on the aircraft's low wing loading to give the required short-field take-off and landing performance. The wings join at the aircraft centerline, with the main spar running from wingtip to wingtip. The wings house integral fuel tanks with a capacity of 3,800 litres (1,000 US gal; 840 imp gal). The aircraft has a large fin, which is swept back at an angle of 50 degrees to move the tailplane rearwards to compensate for the short rear fuselage. The horizontal tailplane itself is unswept.

The Yak-40 was the first Soviet-built airliner designed to Western airworthiness requirements.

== Operational history ==
The first of five prototypes made its maiden flight on 21 October 1966, with production being launched at the Saratov Aviation Plant in 1967 and Soviet type certification granted in 1968. The type carried out its first passenger service for Aeroflot on 30 September 1968. In 1970, the type would experience its first fatal accident and hull loss with the crash of Aeroflot Flight Sh-4. In the 1972 version, a tailspin was removed. In 1974, new version was introduced, with non-stop flight distance increased. Also, the forward door on the right side of the fuselage changed its place – it was located together with the sixth window.

In 1975, the last upgrade of Yak-40 took place – the number of cabin windows on the right side changed from nine to eight.

By the time production ended in November 1981, the factory at Saratov had produced 1,011 or 1,013 aircraft. By 1993 Yak-40s operated by Aeroflot had carried 354 million passengers. As well as being the backbone of Aeroflot's local operations, flying to 276 domestic destinations in 1980, the Yak-40 was also an export success. In addition to this, Yak-40 became the first Russian/Soviet aircraft to get flying certificates from Italy and West Germany. It was demonstrated in 75 countries of the world, including the US, where orders for the Yak-40 were made.

A total of 130 were exported to Afghanistan, Angola, Bulgaria, Cambodia, Cuba, Czechoslovakia, Equatorial Guinea, Ethiopia, Germany, Guatemala, Honduras, Hungary, Italy, Laos, Madagascar, Philippines, Poland, Syria, Vietnam, Yugoslavia and Zambia.

As of July 2021, a Yak-40 has begun testing with an electric propeller engine in the nose of the aircraft.

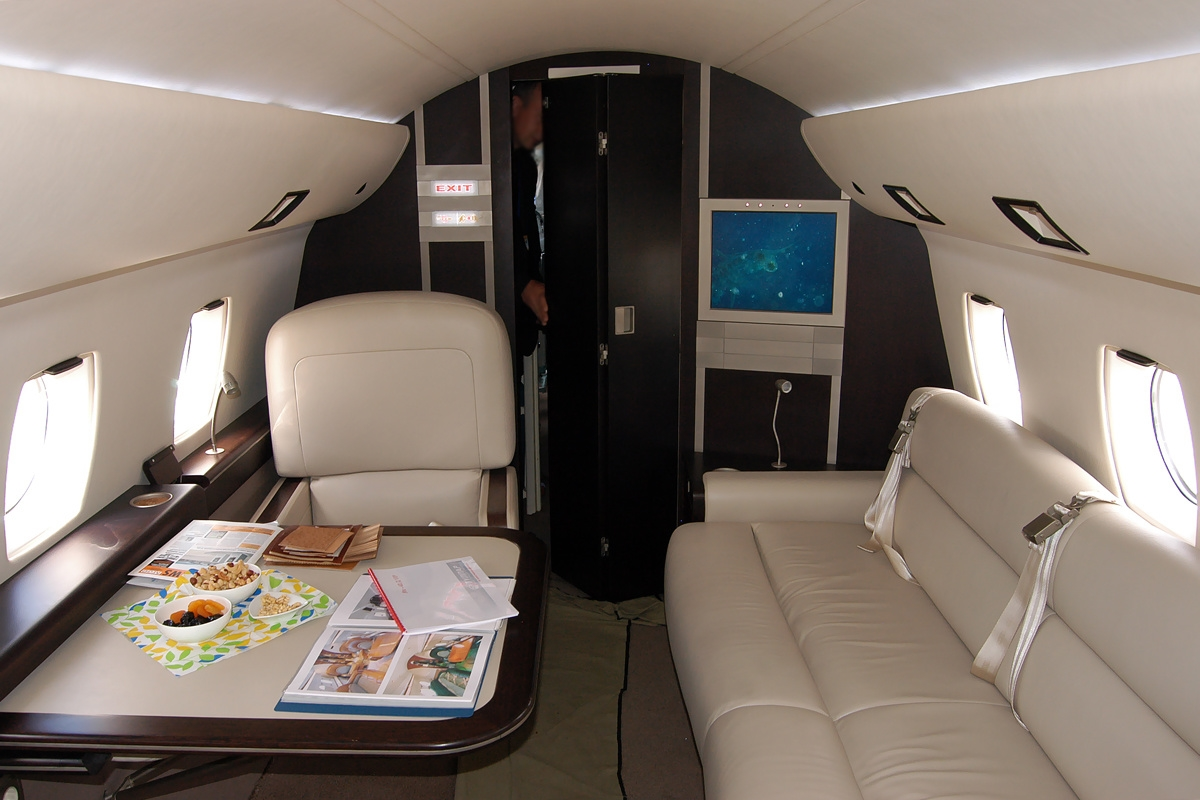
Yak-40 business aircraft interior

== Variants ==
Data from:- OKB Yakovlev

- Yak-40 – The first production model.
- Yak-40-25 Military conversion with the nose of a MiG-25R and SRS-4A Elint installation.
- Yak-40 Akva (Aqua) – Military conversion with nose probe, pylon-mounted sensors, a fuselage dispenser and underwing active jammer pods.
- Yak-40D (Dal'niy – long-distance) – with non-stop flight distance enlarged.
- Yak-40EC – Export version.
- Yak-40 Fobos (Phobos) – Military conversion with two dorsal viewing domes and a removable window on each side.
- Yak-40K – cargo / convertible / combi version with a large freight door. Produced in 1975–81.
- Yak-40 Kalibrovshchik – Military Elint conversion with a "farm" of blade, dipole and planar antennas.
- Yak-40L – Proposed version with two Lycoming LF507-1N turbofans, a joint program between Skorost and Textron (now Allied-Signal) Lycoming. The original design would have had a slightly swept wing.
- Yak-40 Liros – Military conversion with nose probe carrying air-data sensors.
- Yak-40M – Proposed 40-seat stretched passenger version.
- Yak-40 M-602 – Flying testbed with a Czechoslovak M 602 turboprop installed in the nose.
- Yak-40 Meteo – Military conversion with multipole dipole antennas and fuselage dispenser.
- Yak-40P – Yak-40L with large nacelles projecting ahead of the wings.
- Yak-40REO – Military conversion with large ventral canoe for IR linescan. Lateral observation blister on right side.
- Yak-40 Shtorm – Military conversion with multiple probes and sensors on the forward sidewalls.
- Yak-40TL – Proposed upgraded version, to be powered by three Lycoming LF 507 turbofan engines.
- Yak-40V – Export version powered by three AI-25T turbofan engines.
- Yak-40MS – Experimental upgrade with two Honeywell TFE731-5 turbofan engines by SibNIA.
- STR-40DT – A proposed twin-engine composite-wing derivative along the line of TVS-2DTS, also being developed by SibNIA. Endorsed, but not supported by Yakovlev.

== Operators ==
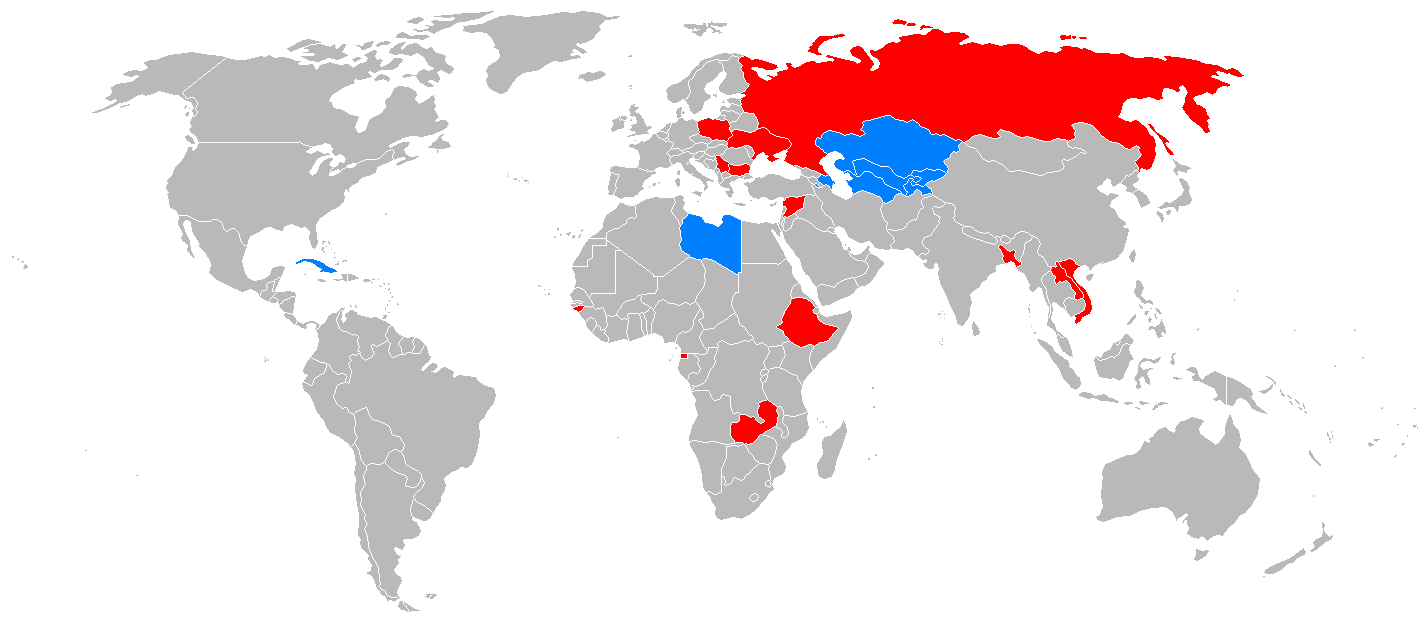
Yak-40 operators (exclusively civil operators in blue)

=== Civilian operators ===
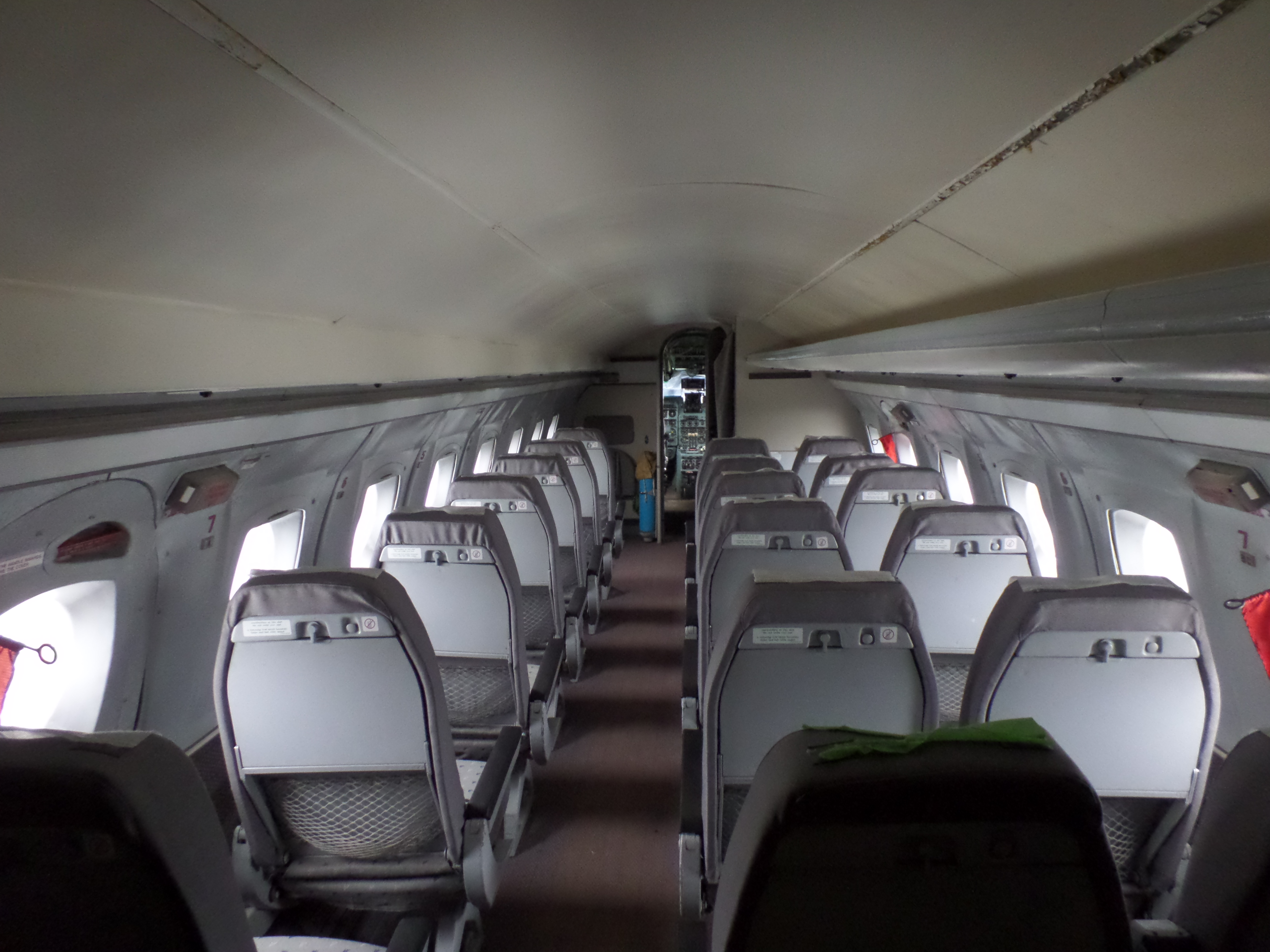
Three-abreast seating configuration of the Yak-40

As of July 2019, a total of 22 out of 1011 Yakovlev Yak-40 aircraft remained in service with civil operators. The airworthiness of several Yak-40 of smaller Russian and Central Asian charter airlines is uncertain, as is the whereabouts of one Air Libya Tibesti aircraft after the civil war. Most aircraft in service as of July 2019 have been reconfigured for VIP-charter services, with fewer than ten remaining in scheduled passenger service. Known operators around the time of 2018 and 2019 were:

Afghanistan

- Ariana Afghan Airlines – former operator
- Bakhtar Afghan Airlines – former operator

Albania

- Ada Air – former operator
- Albanian Airlines - former operator

Angola

- TAAG Angola Airlines – former operator

Azerbaijan

- Azerbaijan Airlines – former operator

Belarus

- Government of Belarus

Bolivia

- Aerosur – former operator

Bulgaria

- Balkan Bulgarian Airlines – former operator
- Hemus Air – former operator

Cuba

- Aerocaribbean – former operator
- Cubana – former operator

Czech Republic

- Government of the Czech Republic – former operator

Czechoslovakia

- CSA Czechoslovak Airlines – former operator
- Government of Czechoslovakia – former operator
- Slov-Air – former operator

Egypt

- EgyptAir – former operator

Greece

- Olympic Airways – former operator

Guatemala

- Mayan World Airlines – former operator

Honduras

- Rollins Air – former operator

Hungary

- Malév – former operator

Italy

- Aertirrena – former operator
- Alinord – former operator
- Avioligure – former operator
- Cabado – former operator

Kazakhstan

- Air Kazakhstan – former operator
- Air Kokshetau – former operator
- Bek Air – former operator
- East Kazakhstan Region Air Enterprise – 2 in cargo configuration
- Euro-Asia Air – former operator
- Semeyavia – former operator
- Tulpar Air Service – former operator
- Zhetysu Aviakompania – 2: one for charter and one in cargo configuration
- Zhezkazgan Air – 1 in service (as of February 2020)

Kyrgyzstan

- Kyrgyzstan Airlines – former operator

Libya

- Air Libya Tibesti – former operator

Lithuania

- Air Lithuania – former operator

Moldova

- Air Moldova – former operator

Peru

- Expreso Aéreo – former operator
- Servicios Aéreos Amazónicos – former operator
- T Doble A (Transportes Aéreos Andahuaylas) – former operator

Philippines

- Interisland Airlines – former operator

Poland

- LOT Polish Airlines – former operator

Russia

- 2nd Sverdlovsk Air Enterprise – former operator
- AeroBratsk – former operator
- Aerolik – former operator
- Ak Bars Aero – former operator
- Amur Airlines – former operator
- Aviakompaniya SKOL – former operator
- Aviastar – former operator
- Belgorod Air Enterprise – former operator
- Bugulma Air Enterprise – former operator
- Byline – former operator
- Center-South Airlines – former operator
- Gazpromavia – former operator
- Khabarovsk Airlines – former operator
- LUKoil-Avia – former operator
- Orel Avia – former operator
- Petropavlovsk-Kamchatsky Air Enterprise – 5 with 4 in cargo configuration and 1 in passenger service (as of July 2021)
- Rossiya – former operator
- RusAir – former operator
- Severstal Air Company – former operator
- Tomskavia – former operator
- Tulpar Air – former operator
- UTair Aviation – former operator
- Vladivostok Avia – former operator (phased out in 2013)
- Volga-Dnepr – former operator
- Vologda Aviation Enterprise – 5 in service (as of February 2025)
- Yak Service – former operator
- Yakutia Airlines – former operator
- Yamal Airlines – former operator
- Yuzhmashavia – former operator

Slovakia

- Government of Slovakia – former operator

Soviet Union

- Aeroflot – former operator

Syria

- Syrian Arab Airlines – former operator

Tajikistan

- Tajikistan Airlines – former operator

Turkmenistan

- Turkmenistan Airlines – former operator

Ukraine

- Motor Sich Airlines
- Aerostar Airlines – former operator
- Constanta Airlines – former operator
- Challenge Aero – former operator

Uzbekistan

- Uzbekistan Airways – former operator

Venezuela

- Oriental de Aviación – former operator

Vietnam

- Vietnam Airlines – former operator

West Germany

- General Air – former operator

=== Military operators ===
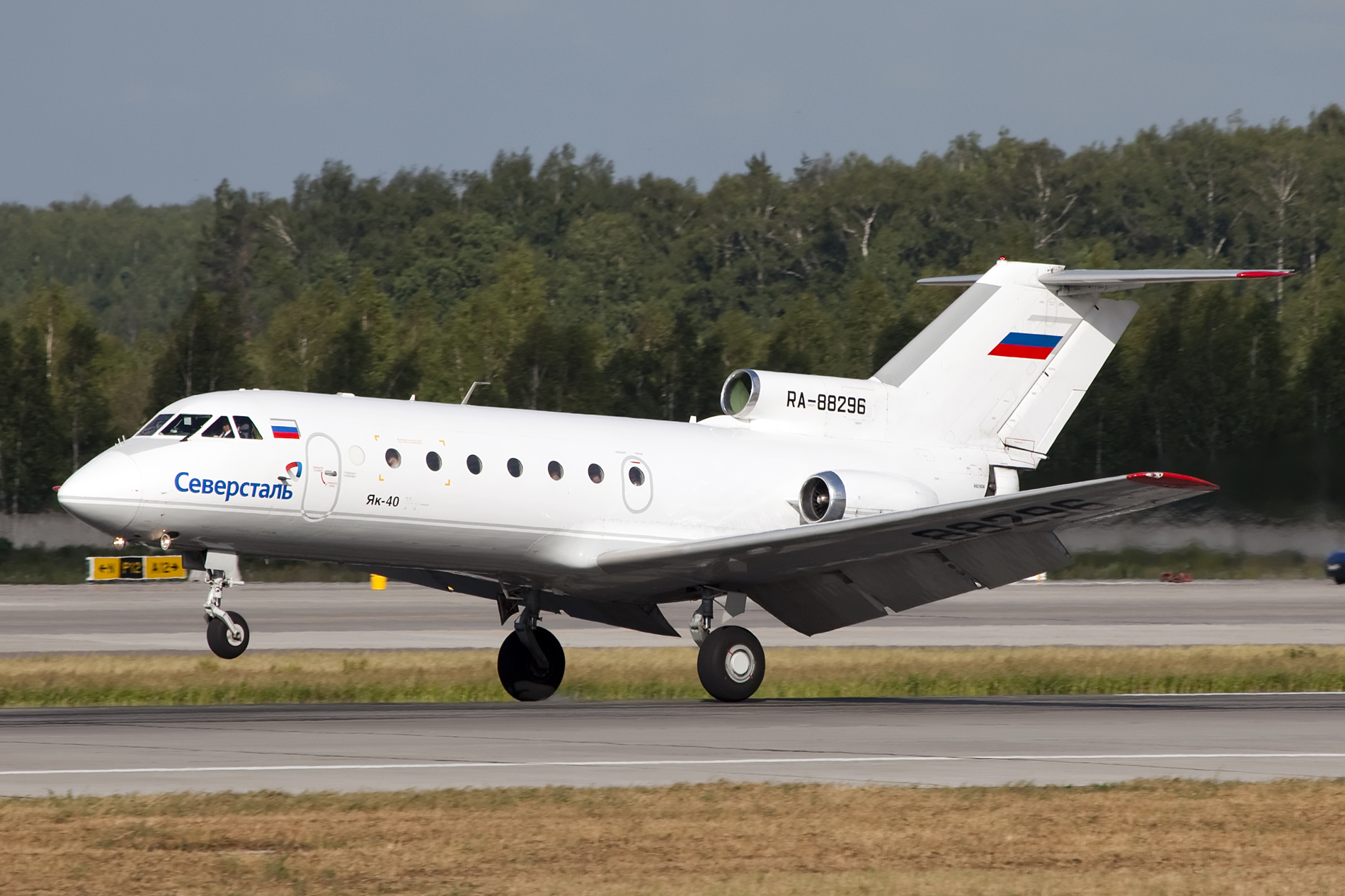
Yak-40 during takeoff

As of November 2012 no more than 17 Yak-40 remained in military service (possibly fewer, with the unclear situation in Syria at the time).

In late 2025, the World Air Forces publication by FlightGlobal, which tracks the aircraft inventories of world's air forces and publishes its counts annually, published the World Air Forces 2026 report. According to that report, there were no Yak-40 aircraft in service in any air force (or other military unit) of the world.

Known former operators are:

Angola
Angolan Air Force – former operator (1 as of December 2016. Retired as of 2026.)
Bulgaria
Bulgarian Air Force - former operator (1 as of 1987. Retired as of 2026.)
Cuba
Cuban Air Force – former operator (2 as of 1987. Retired as of 2026.)
Czech Republic
Czech Air Force – former operator (1 as of December 2016. Retired as of 2026.)
Czechoslovakia
Czechoslovak Air Force – former operator
East Germany
East German Air Force – former operator
Equatorial Guinea
Military of Equatorial Guinea – former operator (Presidential aircraft. Retired as of 2026.)
Ethiopia
Ethiopian Air Force – former operator (1 in service. Retired as of 2026.)
Guinea-Bissau
Guinea-Bissau Air Force – former operator
Hungary
Hungarian Air Force – former operator
Kazakhstan
Armed Forces of the Republic of Kazakhstan – former operator (1 in service. Retired as of 2026.)
Laos
Lao People's Liberation Army Air Force – former operator
Lithuania
Lithuanian Air Force – former operator
Madagascar
Military of Madagascar – former operator (2 in service. Retired as of 2026.)
Poland
Polish Air Force – former operator
Russia
Russian Air Force – former operator (1 in service. Retired as of 2026.)
Serbia
Serbian Air Force – former operator
Soviet Union
Soviet Air Force – former operator
Syria
Syrian Air Force – former operator. All Syrian Air Force's aircraft were removed from World Air Forces 2026 report. It is thus questionable if the Syrian Air Force has any flying aircraft, and in particular any Yak-40, in their inventory as of December 2025.
Vietnam
Vietnam People's Air Force – former operator
Yemen
Yemen Air Force – former operator (2 in service. Retired as of 2026.)
Yugoslavia
Yugoslav Air Force – former operator
Zambia
Zambian Air Force – former operator
Zimbabwe
Air Force of Zimbabwe - former operator

North Korea

Korean People's Army Air Force ordered 11 in 1978, delivered in 1980, for VIP transport, including for the Supreme Leader for national transport and short haul diplomatic trips. They have rarely appeared in public, and currently is likely in a state of semi-retirement.

== Specifications (Yak-40) ==
Yakovlev Yak-40 3-view drawing

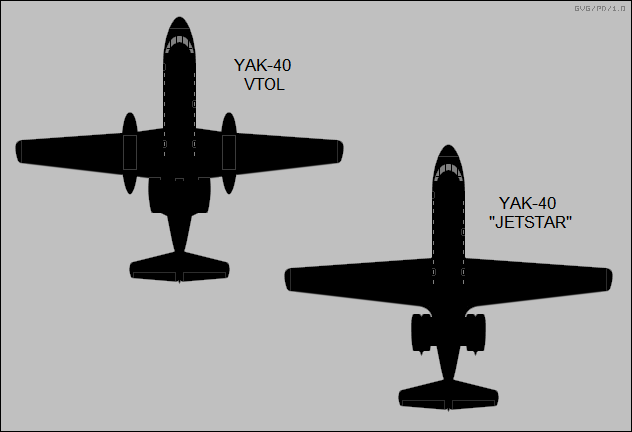
Proposed VTOL and four-engined Yak-40 variants

Data from Jane's All The World's Aircraft 1976–77

General characteristics

- Crew: 3 (two pilots, one flight mechanic)
- Capacity: 32 passengers
- Length: 20.36 m (66 ft 10 in)
- Wingspan: 25.0 m (82 ft 0 in)
- Height: 6.50 m (21 ft 4 in)
- Wing area: 70.00 m^{2} (753.5 sq ft)
- Aspect ratio: 9:1
- Empty weight: 9,400 kg (20,723 lb)
- Max takeoff weight: 15,500 kg (34,172 lb)
- Fuel capacity: 3,910 L (860 imp gal; 1,030 US gal)
- Powerplant: 3 × Ivchenko AI-25 turbofan engines, 14.7 kN (3,300 lbf) thrust each

Performance

- Maximum speed: Mach 0.7 (IAS)
- Cruise speed: 550 km/h (340 mph, 300 kn) at 7,000 m (23,000 ft) (max. cruise)
- Range: 1,800 km (1,100 mi, 970 nmi)
- Service ceiling: 8,000 m (26,000 ft)
- Rate of climb: 8.00 m/s (1,575 ft/min)

== See also ==
Related development

- Yakovlev Yak-42

Aircraft of comparable role, configuration, and era

- Fokker F28
- Fokker 70
- VFW-Fokker 614

Related lists

- List of jet airliners

== Bibliography ==
- Cooper, Tom; Weinert, Peter; Hinz, Fabian; Lepko, Mark (2011). African MiGs, Volume 2: Madagascar to Zimbabwe. Houston: Harpia Publishing. ISBN 978-0-9825539-8-5.
- Gordon, Yefim, Dmitry Komissarov and Sergey Komissarov. OKB Yakovlev: A History of the Design Bureau and its Aircraft. Hinkley, UK: Midland Publishing, 2005. ISBN 1-85780-203-9.
- Gunston, Bill. The Osprey Encyclopedia of Russian Aircraft 1875–1995. London:Osprey, 1995. ISBN 1-85532-405-9.
- Gunston, Bill and Yefim Gordon. Yakovlev Aircraft since 1924. London, UK: Putnam Aeronautical Books, 1997. ISBN 1-55750-978-6.
- Hatch, Paul F. "World's Air Forces 1987". Flight International.Vol. 132, No. 4090, 28 November 1987, pp. 36–106. ISSN 0015-3710
- Hoyle, Craig. "World Air Forces Directory". Flight International. Vol. 190, No. 5566, 6–12 December 2016, pp. 22–53. ISSN 0015-3710.
- Ottenhof, Guus; Hillman, Peter and Jessup, Stuart. Soviet Transports. Aviation Hobby World. 1996. ISBN 0-907178-60-X.
- Stroud, John. Soviet Transport Aircraft since 1945. London:Putnam, 1968. ISBN 0-370-00126-5.
- Thisdell, Dan and Seymour, Chris. "World Airliner Census". Flight International, Vol. 196, No. 5694, 30 July–5 August 2019. ISSN 0015-3710. pp. 24–47.
- Taylor, John W. R. Jane's All The World's Aircraft 1976–77. London:Jane's Yearbooks, 1976. ISBN 0-354-00538-3.
