= Artel Staratelei "Amur" Airlines =

Russian charter airline

- Hubs: Mar Kyuel, Khabarovsk
- Fleet size: 12
- Parent company: Artel-Amur
- Headquarters: Khabarovsk
- Key people: Lopatyuk Viktor Yushchenko (Director), Hnatiuk Nikolai (Deputy General Director)

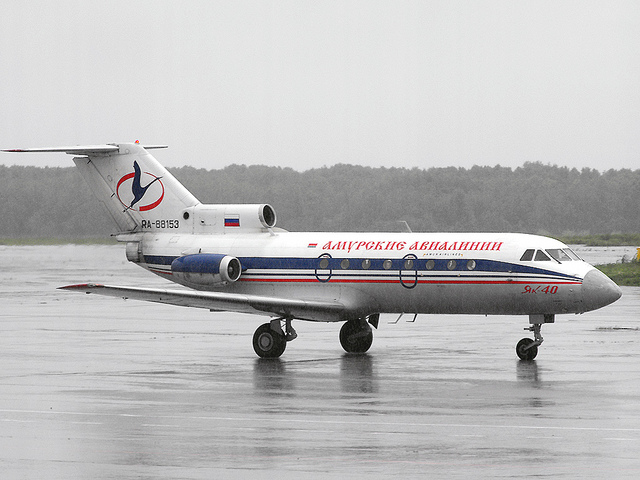
Artel Staratelei "Amur" Airlines Yakovlev Yak-40, 2009

Artel Staratelei "Amur" Airlines was a charter passenger airline based in Khabarovsk, Russia; it was owned by Artel-Amur.

== Fleet ==
Aircraft type	Active	Notes
Antonov An-2	2	
Antonov An-24RV	1	
Antonov An-26	1	
Antonov An-26B	1	
Mil Mi-2	2	
Mil Mi-8T	2	
Yakovlev Yak-40	3	

== Incidents ==
27 June 2010 - Northern Khabarovsk Krai - Mil Mi-8T crash-landed due to the failure of the tail rotor. The onboard mechanic received minor injuries, other crew members and passengers were not injured.
