= Simon Lang =

American science fiction writer (born 1934)

- Born: Darlene Artell Hartman; 1934 (age 91–92)
- Occupations: Writer and speaker
- Writing career
- Genre: Science fiction
- Notable work: "Einai series"

Simon Lang is the pen name of science fiction writer and speaker Darlene Artell Hartman (born 1934). Her principal works are the "Einai series".

== Bibliography ==
=== Einai series ===
- Simon Lang (June 1973). All the Gods of Eisernon. Avon Books.
- Simon Lang (1974). The Elluvon Gift. Avon Books.
- Simon Lang (July 1992). The Trumpets of Tagan. Ace Books. ISBN 0-441-82576-1.
- Simon Lang (April 1993). Timeslide. ISBN 0-441-80928-6.
- Simon Lang (January 1994). Hopeship. ISBN 0-441-34306-6.

=== Analysis ===
Reviewers spotted parallels between the "Einai" universe and the universe of Star Trek: The Original Series as soon as the first book in the series was published. The Einai novels feature Captain Paul Riker, commander of the Galactic Federation starship USS Skipjack, and his half-human half-Einai telepathic Science Officer Dao Marik; which reviewers directly compared to Captain James T. Kirk, the United Federation of Planets starship USS Enterprise, and the Enterprise's half-human half-Vulcan telepathic Science Officer Spock.

The John Clute and Peter Nicholl's Encyclopaedia of SF notes that the first two books of the series "suffer from their all too clear resemblance to Star Trek, for which Hartmann (sic) had written". Zweig describes the series as "an object lesson in knowing when to stop writing", describing the first book as "very well written space opera that left me wishing for more" but the fourth book in the series as "probably one of the worst novels I've read in the past couple of years".
