= List of preserved Boeing aircraft =

This article is a list of aircraft that were manufactured by Boeing and are in preservation.

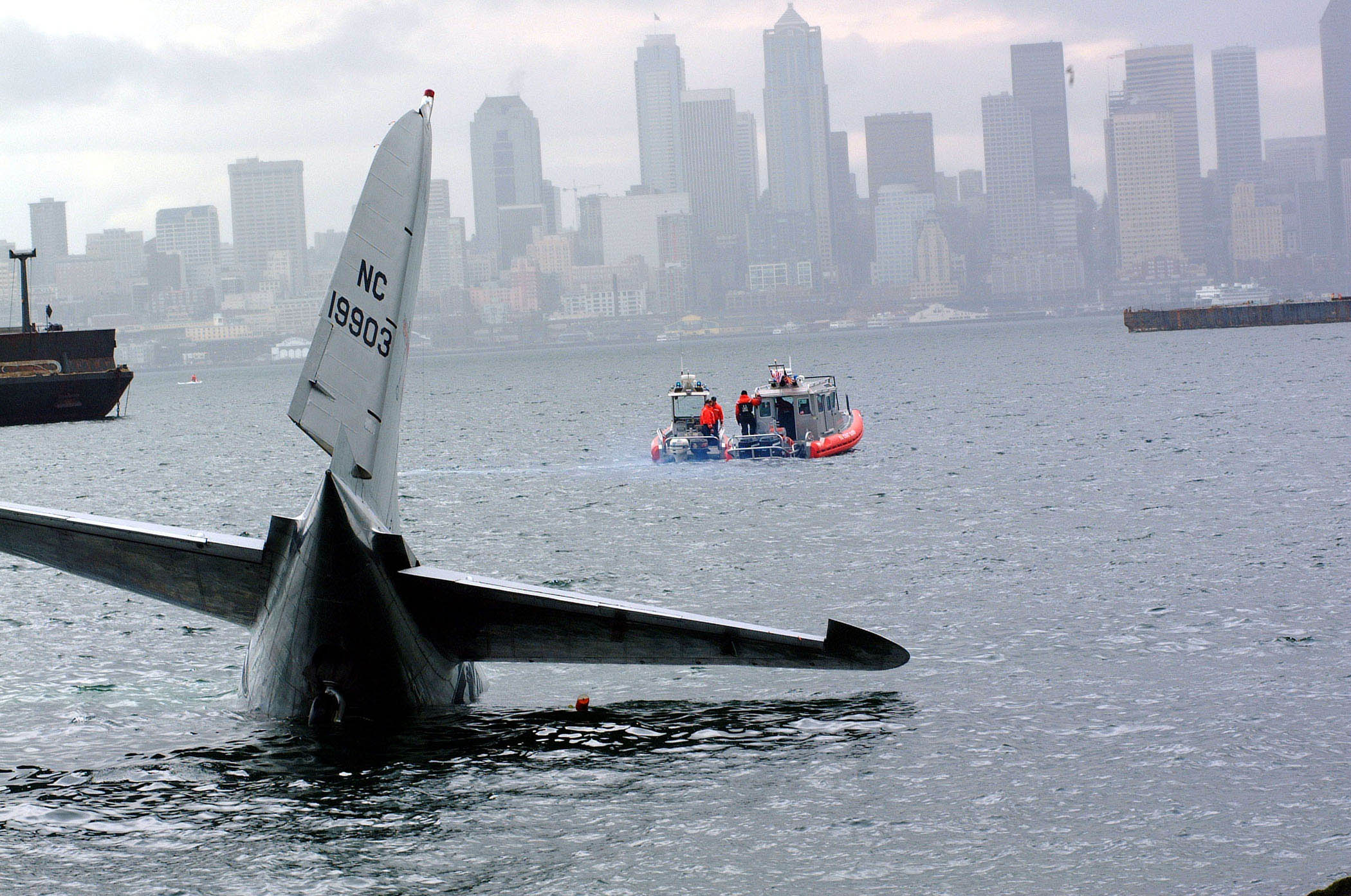
NC19903 (a preserved Boeing 307) sunken at Elliott Bay in Seattle, Washington

== Accidents and incidents ==
=== In preservation ===
- On August 12, 1985, Japan Air Lines Flight 123, a Boeing 747SR-46 registered as JA8119, was performing a flight from Tokyo International Airport, Tokyo, Japan, to Osaka International Airport, Osaka, Japan, when it crashed at Mount Takamagahara in Ueno, Gunma Prefecture after part of its vertical stabilizer separated from the aircraft due to structural failure caused by an improper repair following a tailstrike leaving 520 dead and 4 injured and is also the worst aircraft crash involving a single aircraft. The wreckage of the aircraft ( including the rear bulkhead that blew off) is preserved at the Safety Promotion Center located on the grounds of Tokyo International Airport in Ota, Tokyo, Japan.
- On March 28, 2002, NC19903 was involved in an accident when it ditched at the Elliott Bay based in Seattle, Washington, United States. However, it was raised, repaired, and placed on static display at the Steven F. Udvar-Hazy Center based in Virginia, United States.

== List ==
=== Boeing 247 ===
Aircraft	Type	Photograph	Build date	First flight	Last flight	Operator	Location	Status	Notes	Ref.
N13347	247D		1933	July 26, 1933	April 26, 2016	Pacific Air Transport; Pennsylvania Central Airlines; Canadian Department of Munitions; Royal Canadian Air Force; Maritime Central Airways; Columbia Airlines; Aerovias Occidentales; Pacific Northwest Aviation Historical Foundation	Museum of Flight in Seattle, Washington, United States.	On static display		

=== Boeing 307 Stratoliner ===
Aircraft	Type	Photograph	Build date	First flight	Last flight	Operator	Location	Status	Notes	Ref.
NC19903	S-307		1940	March 22, 1940	June 1994	Pan Am; Airline Training Incorporated; Haiti Air Force; Flight Investment Corp; Ewell Nord; Aviation Specialities	Steven F. Udvar-Hazy Center at Virginia, United States	On static display	Named "Clipper Flying Cloud" by Pan Am. Involved in a wreck at Elliott Bay	

=== Boeing 367-80 ===
Aircraft	Type	Photograph	Build date	First flight	Last flight	Operator	Location	Status	Notes	Ref.
N70700	367-80		1954	July 15, 1954	August 27, 2003	Boeing	National Air and Space Museum in Washington, D.C., United States	On static display		

=== Boeing 707 ===
Aircraft	Type	Photograph	Build date	First flight	Last flight	Operator	Location	Status	Notes	Ref.
VH-XBA	707-138B		March 20, 1959	June 30-July 2, 1960	July 7, 2006	Qantas	Qantas Founders Museum in Longreach, Queensland, Australia	On static display		
N707JT	707-138B		July 29, 1964	September 1, 1964		Qantas 1964–1969 as VH-EBM; Braniff International Airways 1969–1974 as N108BN; TAG Aviation 1977–1995 as N707XX	Historical Aircraft Restoration Society, Albion Park Rail, New South Wales, Australia	Undergoing restoration	Previously owned by actor and Qantas ambassador John Travolta, donated to HARS in 2017.	
4X-BYD	707-131(F)		1959	July 4, 1959	Early 1990s	Israeli Air Force; TWA	Israeli Air Force Museum near Hatzerim, Israel	On static display		
OO-SJA	707-329		1959	December 4, 1959	Early 1990s	Sabena	Royal Military Museum Brussels, Belgium	On static display		
4X-JYW/F-BHSE	707-328		1959	February 29, 1960	Early 1990s	Air France; Israeli Air Force	Israeli Air Force Museum, Beersheba – Hatzerim, Israel	On static display		
A20-627	707-338C		April 2, 1968	April 30, 1968	February 21, 2001	Qantas 1968–1979 as VH-EAG; Royal Australian Air Force 1979–2001 as A20-627	Historical Aircraft Restoration Society, Albion Park Rail, New South Wales, Australia	On static display	Nose only	
G-APFJ	707-436		1960	September 22, 1960	June 11, 1981	British Overseas Airways Corporation →British Airways	National Museum of Flight, East Fortune, United Kingdom	On static display	Nose only	
D-ABOB	707-430		1960	January 25, 1960	September 27, 1976	Lufthansa	Stand 65 at Hamburg Airport, Germany	Scrapped	Named Hamburg	
N7515A	707-123		1959	1959	February 1985	Lufthansa	Deutsches Museum in Munich, Germany	On static display	Posing as D-ABOF, a 707-430, Nose on display	
4X-ATA	707-458		1961	May 1961	1984	EL AL Israel Airlines Ltd.	Cradle of Aviation Museum in Garden City, New York, United States	On static display	Nose on display	

=== Boeing 727 ===
Aircraft	Type	Photograph	Build date	First flight	Last flight	Operator	Location	Status	Notes	Ref.
N7001U	727-022		1963	February 9, 1963	March 2, 2016	United Airlines	Museum of Flight in Seattle, Washington, United States	On static display		
N7004U	727-022		1963	October 29, 1963	1991	United Airlines	Pima Air & Space Museum at Pima County, Arizona, United States	Awaiting restoration		
N7017U	727-022		1969	October 7, 1969	1991	United Airlines	Chicago Museum of Science and Industry at Chicago, Illinois, United States	On static display		<
HL7350	727-281		1971	May 1971	1991	All Nippon Airways (JA8415) May 1971.; Korean Air (HL7350) 1980.	KidZania Ha Noi at Lotte Mall West Lake Hanoi in Hanoi, Vietnam	On static display	Nose only On 13 June 1991, it performed an unexpected gear-up landing at Daegu International Airport. After this, it was displayed at Inha University and replaced by HL7526 (B777-200ER) in 2024.	

=== Boeing 737 ===
Aircraft	Type	Photograph	Build date	First flight	Last flight	Operator	Location	Status	Notes	Ref.
N515NA	737-130		1967	April 9, 1967	2003	NASA	Museum of Flight in Seattle, Washington, United States	On static display		
N9009U	737-222		1968	April 22, 1968	November 30, 1998	United Airlines	Southern Illinois University Carbondale at Southern Illinois Airport, Illinois, United States	On static display		
N213US	737-201		1969	April 18, 1969	September 12, 1995	USAir	Museum of Flight in Seattle, Washington, United States	On static display		
LV-WTX	737-281		1972	January 5, 1972	March 2005	All Nippon Airways (JA8415) April 13, 1972.; Air Nippon (JA8415) October 1, 1988.; Aerolineas Argentinas (LV-PMI) (April 2, 1997)	National Museum of Aeronautics in Morón, Buenos Aires, Argentina	On static display		

=== Boeing 747 ===
Aircraft	Type	Photograph	Build date	First flight	Last flight	Operator	Location	Status	Notes	Ref.
N7470	747-121		September 30, 1968	February 9, 1969	April 6, 1995	Boeing	Museum of Flight in Seattle, Washington, United States	On static display	Nicknamed City of Everett	
N747GE /N744PA	747-121		1969	1970	January 25, 2017	General Electric; Pan Am	Pima Air & Space Museum, Tucson, Arizona, United States	On static display		
N601US	747-151		November 7, 1969	1970	1999	Northwest Orient Airlines 1970–1986 as N601US; Northwest Airlines 1986–2000 as N601US	National Air and Space Museum, Washington, D.C., United States	On static display.	Nose only	
ZS-SAN	747-244B		1971	1971	2002	South African Airways	South African Airways Museum Society in Rand Airport, South Africa	On static display	Nicknamed Lebombo	
F-BPVJ	747-128		1973	1973	2001	Air France	Musée de l'air et de l'espace in Le Bourget, France	On static display		
ZS-SPC	747SP-44		1976	1976	2006	South African Airways; Air Namibia; Avia Airlines; Air Mauritius	South African Airways Museum Society in Rand Airport, South Africa	On static display	Nicknamed Maluti	
D-ABYM	747-230B		1978	1978	2001	Lufthansa	Technik Museum Speyer in Speyer (Rhineland-Palatinate), Germany	On static display		
PH-BUK	747-206SUD		1978	September 1978	November 2003	KLM	Aviodrome in Lelystad, Netherlands	On static display		
VH-EBQ	747-238B		1979	1979	2002	Qantas; Air Pacific	Qantas Founders Museum in Longreach, Queensland, Australia	On static display		
N642NW	747-212B		1980			Singapore Airlines; Garuda Indonesia; Northwest Airlines	Museum of Aeronautical Science in Shibayama, Chiba, Japan	On static display	Nose only	
JA8147	747SR-81		1980	November 1980	March 2004	All Nippon Airways	Universal Studios Hollywood, Universal City, California, United States	On static display	Dismantled and its remains used in January 2005 to provide the setting for a plane crash scene in Steven Spielberg's War of the Worlds. Preserved in the same condition as the film.	
TF-ARN	747-2F6B(SF)		1980	December 2, 1980	2015	Philippine Airlines; Air Atlanta Icelandic	Donghai Cloud Corridor, Dinghai, Zhoushan, Zhejiang, China	On static display		
EC-IAF	747-256B		March 24, 1981	1981	October 23, 2001	Iberia; Air Atlanta Icelandic	Museo Nacional de Ciencia y Tecnología, La Coruña, Spain.	On static display	Nose only. Nicknamed Lope de Vega	
N661US	747-451		1988	April 29, 1988	September, 2015	Boeing 1988–1989 as N401PW; Northwest Airlines 1989–2008; Delta Air Lines 2008–2015	Delta Flight Museum, Georgia, United States	On static display	See also: Northwest Airlines Flight 85	
VH-OJA	747-438		1989	July 3, 1989	March 8, 2015	Qantas	Historical Aircraft Restoration Society, Albion Park Rail, New South Wales, Australia	On static display	Nicknamed City of Canberra	
PH-BFB	747-406		1989	1989	2018	KLM	Corendon Village Hotel Amsterdam in Haarlemmermeer, Netherlands	On static display	Nicknamed City of Bangkok; Corendon Dutch Airlines Livery	
G-CIVB	747-436		1994	February 1994	April 6, 2020	British Airways	Cotswold Airport, Kemble, Gloucestershire, England, United Kingdom	On static display	Negus Retro Livery	
G-BYGA	747-436		1998	1998	2020	British Airways	The Deck by Doors2Manual in Salford, United Kingdom	On static display	Top deck only	
N747NA	747SP-21		1977	April 25, 1977	September 29, 2022	Pan Am; United Airlines; NASA	Pima Air & Space Museum in Tucson, Arizona, United States	On static display	Named Clipper Lindbergh	

=== Boeing 757 ===
Aircraft	Type	Photograph	Build date	First flight	Last flight	Operator	Location	Status	Notes	Ref.
N608DA	757-232		1985	May 15, 1985	October 2013	Delta Air Lines; Song; Delta Air Lines	Delta Flight Museum in Atlanta, Georgia, United States	On static display		
N638DL	757-232		1988	May 10, 1988	July 2013	Delta Air Lines; Song; Delta Air Lines; Jet Midwest	Aberdeen Phillips Army Airfield at Aberdeen Proving Ground, Maryland, United States	On static display	Applied with "Jerry, Thank you for your leadership from the 47,163 employees of Delta" titles.	
N537UA	757-222		1991	July 3, 1991	December 3, 2015	United Airlines	Atlantic City International Airport at Atlantic County, New Jersey, United States	On static display	Preserved as a tactical trainer.	
N757MA	757-24Q		1997	January 7, 1997		Mid East Jet; Bank of Utah	EuroAirport Basel Mulhouse Freiburg at Saint-Louis, Haut-Rhin, Grand Est France	On static display	Preserved as a fire training airframe	

=== Boeing 767 ===
Aircraft	Type	Photograph	Build date	First flight	Last flight	Operator	Location	Status	Notes	Ref.
N102DA	767-232		October 27, 1982	August 27, 1982	March 6, 2006	Delta Air Lines	Delta Flight Museum in Hapeville, Georgia, United States	On static display		
N301AA	767-223			June 10, 1982		American Airlines	American Museum of Aviation in Las Vegas, United States	On static display	Nose only	

=== Boeing 777 ===
Aircraft	Type	Photograph	Build date	First flight	Last flight	Operator	Location	Status	Notes	Ref.
N7771/B-HNL	777-200		1994	June 12, 1995	September 18, 2018	Boeing 1994–2000 as N7771; Cathay Pacific as B-HNL	Pima Air & Space Museum, Tucson, Arizona, United States	On static display		
HL7531	777-200ER		1997	March 14, 1997	2020	Korean Air	Dongwon Institute of Science and Technology, South Korea	On static display	Nose only	
HL7526	777-200ER		1998	1998	2020	Korean Air	Inha University, Incheon, South Korea	On static display		
HZ-AKG	777-268ER		1998	March 1998	September 2016	Saudia	Boulevard Runway, Riyadh, Saudi Arabia	On static display		
HZ-AKK	777-268ER		1998	September 1998	September 2016	Saudia	Boulevard Runway, Riyadh, Saudi Arabia	On static display		
HZ-AKP	777-268ER		1999	March 1999	June 2017	Saudia	Boulevard Runway, Riyadh, Saudi Arabia	On static display		

=== Boeing 787 Dreamliner ===
Aircraft	Type	Photograph	Build date	First flight	Last flight	Operator	Location	Status	Notes	Ref.
N787BA/ZA001	787-8		July 8, 2007	December 15, 2009	Undetermined	Boeing	Chubu Centrair Airport in Nagoya, Japan	On static display		
N787EX/ZA002	787-8		May 12, 2009	December 22, 2009	Undetermined	All Nippon Airways	Pima Air & Space Museum near Tucson, Arizona, United States	On static display		
N787BX/ZA003	787-8		June 2009	March 14, 2010	Undetermined	Boeing	Museum of Flight in Seattle, Washington, United States	On static display		
