= N747GE =

General Electric testbed aircraft

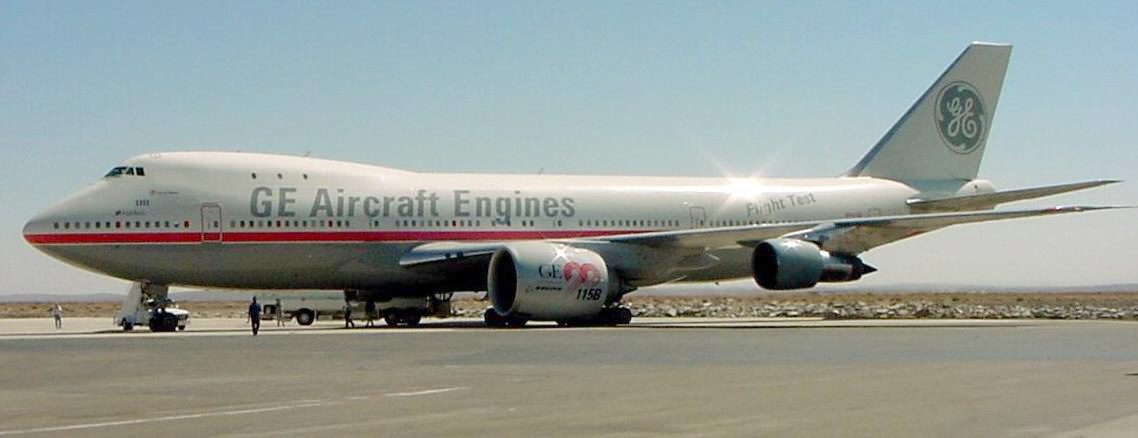
- N747GE with a GE90 jet engine at the Mojave Airport in during flight test of the General Electric GE90

General information
- Other names: Clipper Star of the Union (1970–1982); Clipper Ocean Spray (1982–1991)
- Type: Boeing 747-121 (Note: The 1 in the suffix denotes that it was a -100 series variant of the 747; 21 is the Boeing customer code for Pan Am.)
- Manufacturer: Boeing
- Owners: Pan Am (1970–1991); GE Aerospace (1992–2017)
- Registration: N744PA (Pan Am); N747GE (GE)
- Flights: 19,251
- Total hours: 90,000

History
- Manufactured: 1969
- First flight: March 3, 1970
- Last flight: January 25, 2017
- Preserved at: Pima Air & Space Museum, Tucson, Arizona
- Fate: Preserved

N747GE is a Boeing 747 aircraft that was used by General Electric Aircraft Engines as a testbed for several of the company's jet engines between 1992 and 2017, including the General Electric GE90 for the Boeing 777, at the time, the world's largest jet engine.

Before being purchased by General Electric, the aircraft was owned by Pan Am and registered N744PA. At Pan Am, the aircraft was named Clipper Star of the Union between 1970 and 1982 and Clipper Ocean Spray between 1982 and 1992.

== History ==
=== Service with Pan Am ===
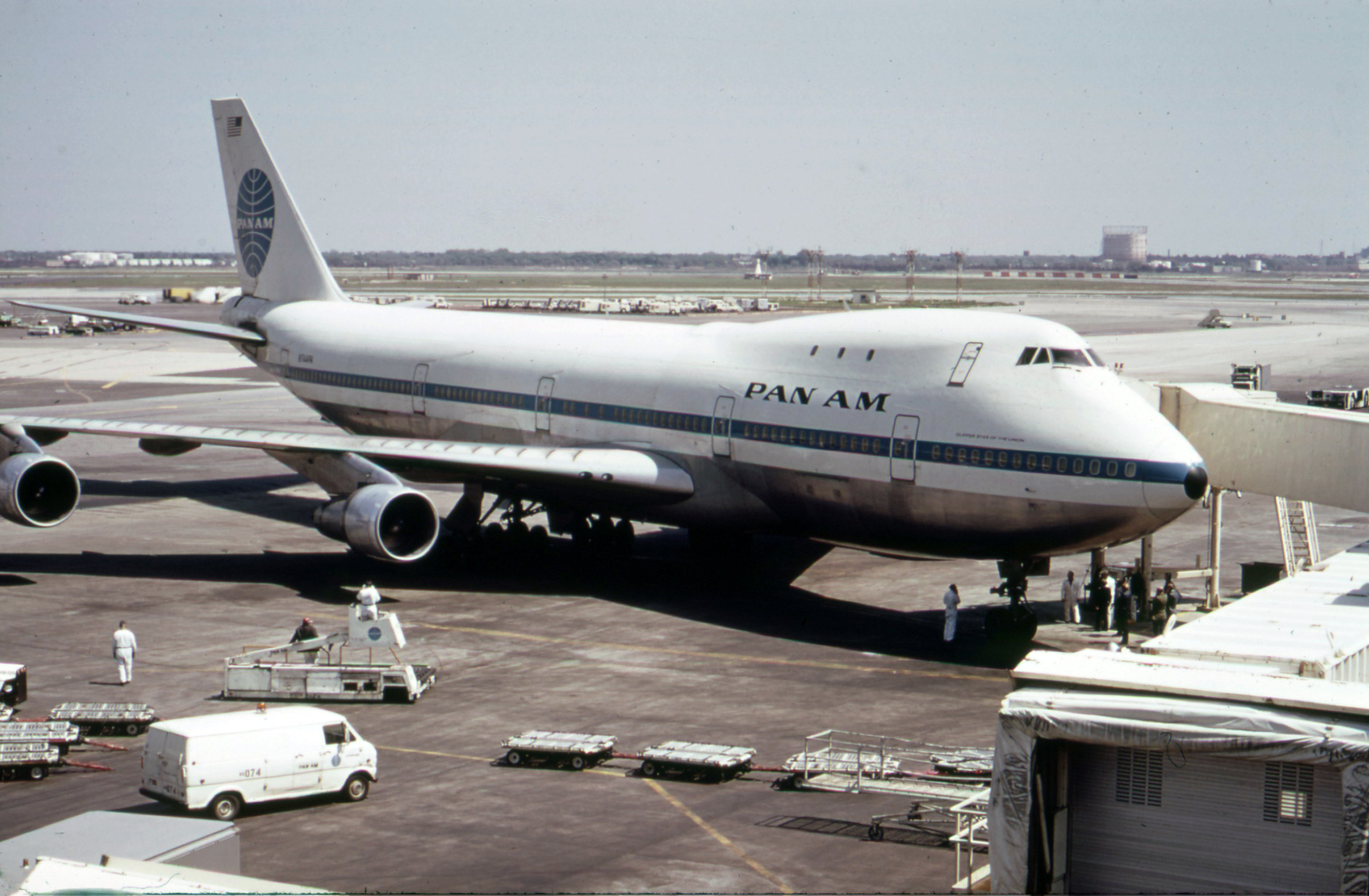
The aircraft, then named Clipper Star of the Union, at John F Kennedy International Airport in May 1973

The Boeing 747-121 rolled off of Boeing's assembly line in 1969 as the 25th Boeing 747 constructed. Originally registered as N744PA, the aircraft was delivered to Pan Am. N744PA remained under the ownership of Pan Am until 1991, when the airline entered bankruptcy.

The aircraft was first named Clipper Star of the Union when delivered to Pan Am in 1970 and operated with that name until 1982 when it was renamed to Clipper Ocean Spray.

=== Service with General Electric ===
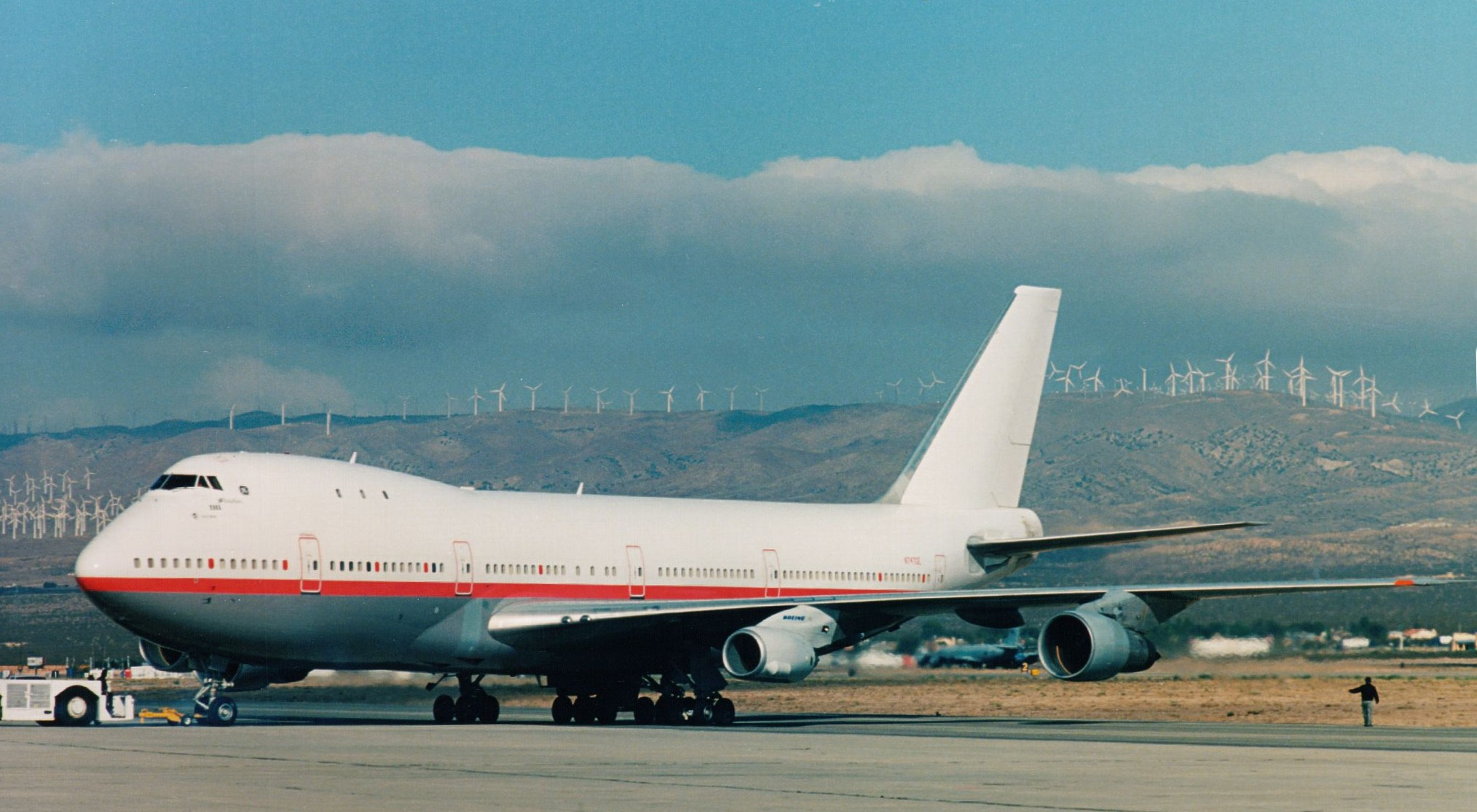
N747GE with CFM56 engine on the #2 pylon at the Mojave Airport in 2002.

General Electric Aircraft Engines (GE) purchased the aircraft after Pan Am's bankruptcy to serve as an airborne laboratory, specifically for testing jet engines from GE and its joint venture partners. The aircraft received several modifications, including removing seats, strengthening the left wing and tail for flight testing and installing data systems. Although intended for testing GE-developed engines, the aircraft was not fitted with General Electric CF6 engines and instead retained its original Pratt & Whitney JT9D engines. According to the company, no economically viable GE-powered 747s were available for purchase at the time.

GE used a four-engine aircraft to swap out the engine on the #2 pylon for an engine under test. The company could then measure fuel burn and engine performance while also subjecting the test engine to difficult conditions such as a high angle of attack during aircraft stalls, zero-G operations, large sideslips and sustained flight in icing conditions. The aircraft first began flight testing out of Mojave Airport in California. In 2003, GE's flight test operations moved into a new hangar at the nearby Victorville Airport.

They used a total of 11 engine models and 39 different kinds of engine builds, beginning with the massive General Electric GE90 for the Boeing 777. Other notable tests include the CFM International CFM56 and its successor the CFM International LEAP for narrow-bodies, the Engine Alliance GP7000 for the Airbus A380, the General Electric GEnx for the Boeing 787 and 747-8, the General Electric CF34 for regional jets and the General Electric Passport for business jets.

GE acquired another testbed aircraft in 2010, N747GF, a newer Boeing 747-400. Facing growing maintenance costs, difficulty obtaining parts and a lack of modern navigation systems, GE made the decision to retire the aircraft. The aircraft made its last test flight with a GEnx engine under evaluation on January 25, 2017.

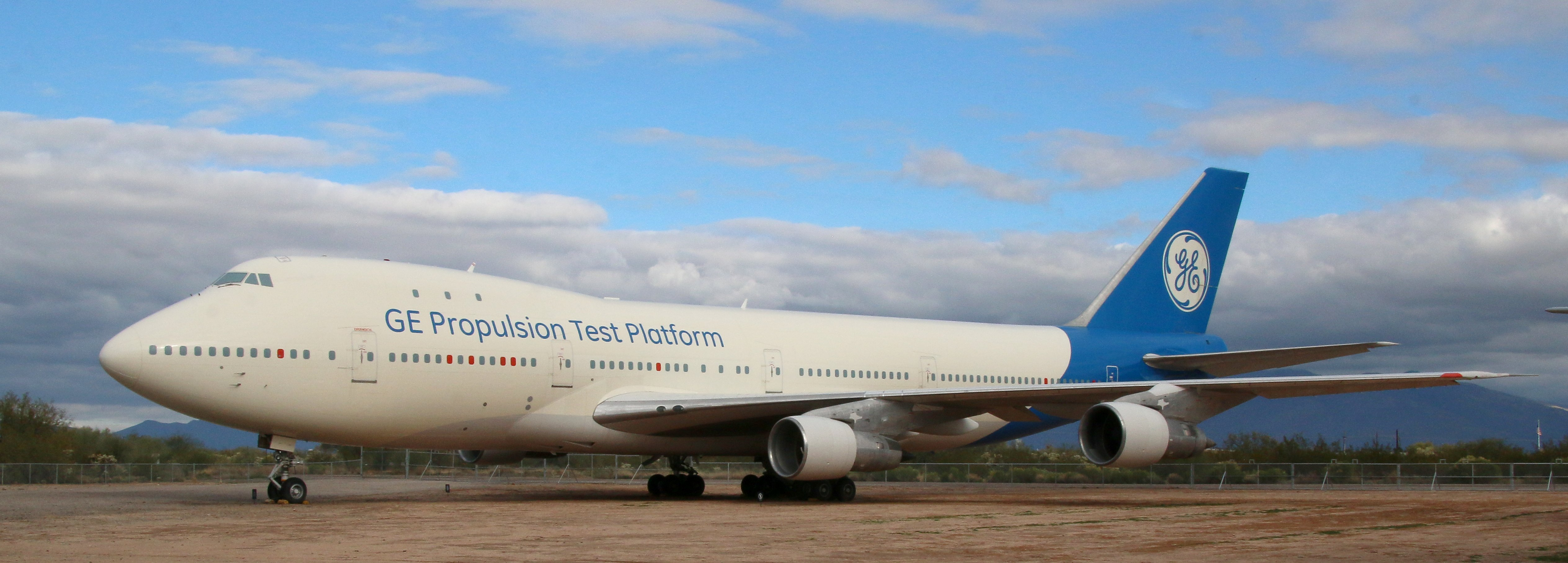
N747GE on display at the Pima Air & Space Museum in 2020.

The final flight of the aircraft occurred on November 15, 2018, when the aircraft departed from GE's test center Victorville and landed at Davis–Monthan Air Force Base, to be donated to the Pima Air & Space Museum, where it has been placed on display.

Throughout its life, the aircraft flew approximately 90,000 hours and 19,251 cycles, including 3,916 hours testing various engines.

== See also ==
- N7470
- List of preserved Boeing aircraft
