= General Electric GE90 =

High-bypass turbofan aircraft engine

GE90

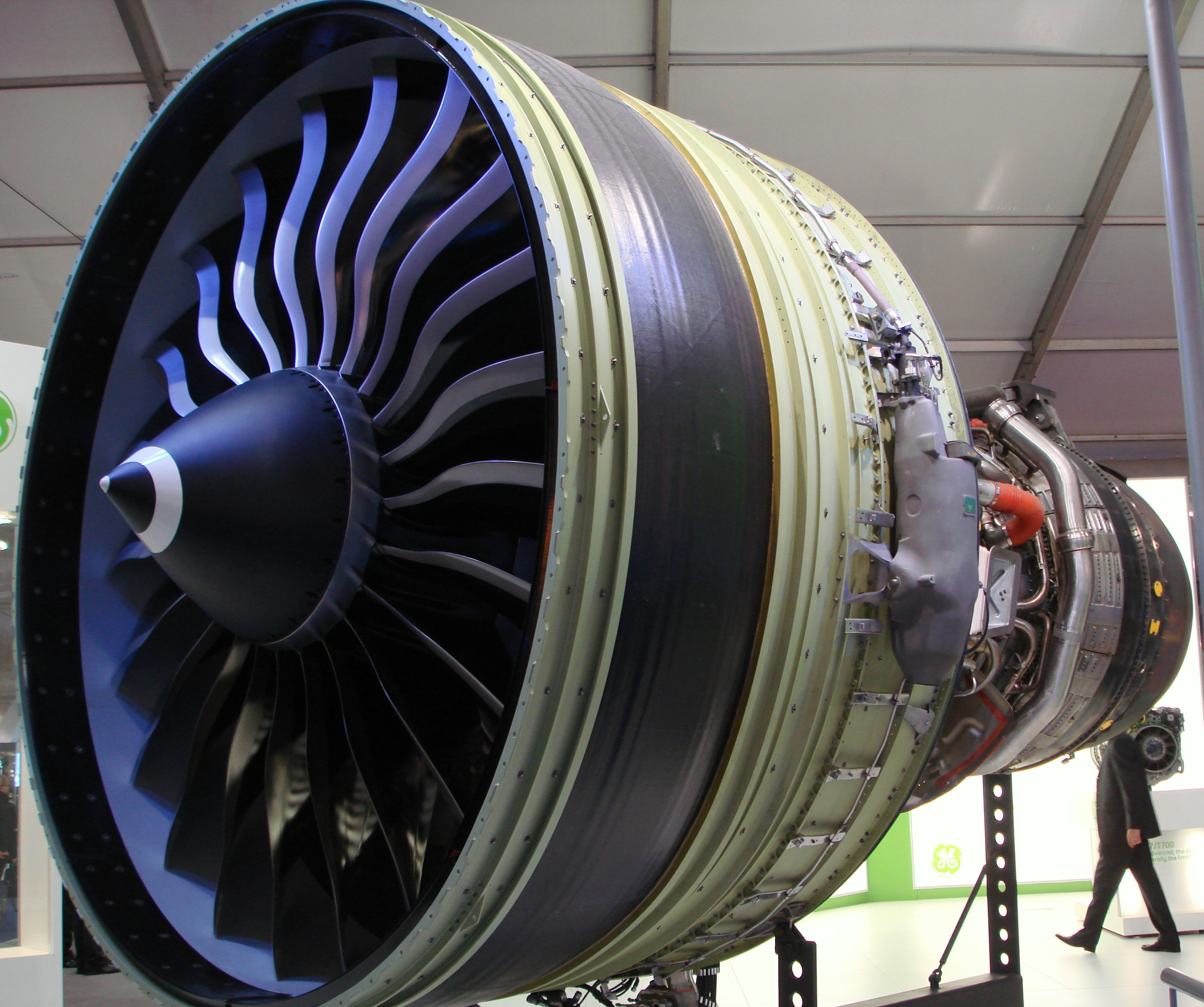
- GE90-115B
- Type: Turbofan
- National origin: United States
- Manufacturer: GE Aerospace
- First run: March 1993
- Major applications: Boeing 777
- Manufactured: 1993–present
- Number built: 2,800 by July 2020
- Developed into: General Electric GEnx; Engine Alliance GP7000; CFM International LEAP; General Electric GE9X

The General Electric GE90 is a family of high-bypass turbofan aircraft engines built by GE Aerospace for the Boeing 777, with thrust ratings from 81,000 to 115,000 pounds-force (360 to 510 kilonewtons). It entered service with British Airways in November 1995. It is one of three engine options for the 777-200 and -200ER, and the exclusive engine of the -200LR, -300ER, and 777F. It was the largest jet engine, until being surpassed in January 2020 by its successor, the 110,000 lbf (490 kN) GE9X, which has a larger fan diameter by 6 inches (15 cm). However, the GE90-115B, the most recent variant of the GE90, is rated for a higher thrust (115,000 lbs) than the GE9X.

== Background ==
In the early 1980s, GE began developing an unducted fan (UDF) engine, which was thought to be a more fuel-efficient option for short-haul airliners, a compelling proposition after the 1979 oil crisis. NASA gave GE a grant in February 1984 to continue its research, eventually building the experimental GE36. One of the major innovations for the engine was its carbon fiber composite fan blades, which were both lighter and stronger than traditional materials. However, the UDF was less reliable than the turbofans of the era; lower fuel costs made the cost of the engine's development less attractive, and the company was worried the GE36 would cannibalize sales of the highly successful CFM56 engine it had co-developed with Snecma of France.

== Development ==
The GE90 engine was launched in 1990 to provide a large turbofan engine for the Boeing 777, a wide-body, long-range, twin-engine jet airliner. GE Aviation teamed with Snecma (France, 24%), IHI (Japan), and Avio (Italy) for the program. The GE90 would face stiff competition as Pratt & Whitney and Rolls-Royce would also offer engines for the 777, the PW4000 and Trent 800, respectively.

The major innovation of the GE90 was that it used 22 carbon fiber composite fan blades, a technology first developed for the GE36. These blades provided double the strength at one-third the weight of traditional titanium fan blades. The 22 fan blades were a significant reduction from the 38 blades used in GE's prior large turbofan, the CF6, despite the 30-inch (760 mm) greater diameter of the GE90. Having fewer fan blades reduces the engine's weight and improves aerodynamic efficiency.

With stiff competition to equip the first-generation 777 models (777-200 and 777-200ER), GE sought to branch out and use the GE90 on other aircraft. Then-CEO Brian H. Rowe went so far as to offer to pay for the development of the GE90 for the Airbus A330, but Airbus rebuffed the plan, instead choosing to focus on the four-engine A340 for the long-haul market.

In the late 1990s, Boeing began developing the second-generation 777 long-range variants (777-200LR, 777-300ER, and 777F). For these aircraft, a more powerful engine in the 100,000 lbf (440 kN) thrust class was required, leading to talks between Boeing and engine manufacturers. General Electric offered to develop the GE90-115B engine, while Rolls-Royce proposed developing the Trent 8104 engine. In 1999, Boeing announced an agreement with General Electric, beating out rival proposals. Under the deal with General Electric, Boeing agreed only to offer GE90 engines on new 777 versions. The GE90-115B had its first run at the GE facility in Peebles, Ohio, in November 2001.

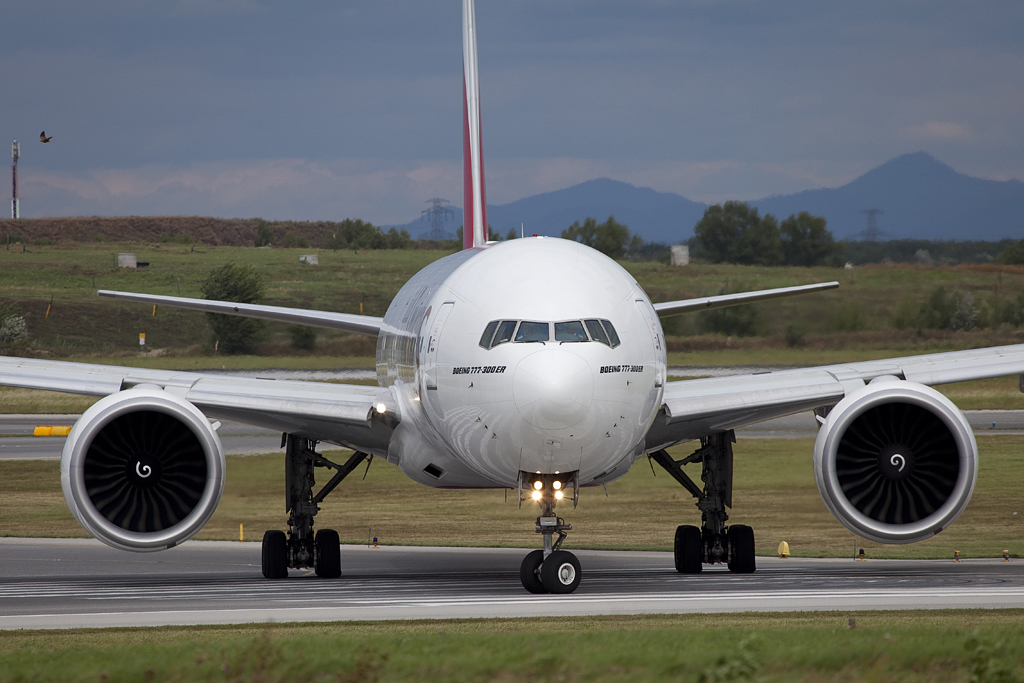
The GE90-115B engine has a fan diameter of 128 in (325 cm). This is comparable to the fuselage widths of the Boeing 737 at 148 in (376 cm) and the Airbus A320 at 156 in (396 cm). By comparison, the fuselage of the Boeing 777, for which the engine was designed, measures 244 in (620 cm) in diameter.

== Design ==
The GE90's 10-stage high-pressure compressor developed a then-industry record pressure ratio of 23:1 and is driven by a 2-stage, air-cooled, HP turbine. A 3-stage low-pressure compressor, situated directly behind the fan, supercharges the core. A 6-stage low-pressure turbine drives the fan/LPC.

The higher-thrust variants, GE90-110B1 and -115B, have a different architecture from that of the earlier GE90 versions. General Electric incorporated an advanced, larger-diameter fan made from composite materials, which enhanced thrust at low flight speeds. However, GE also needed to increase core power to improve net thrust at high flight speeds. Consequently, GE elected to increase core capacity by removing one stage from the rear of the HP compressor and adding a stage to the LP compressor, which more than compensated for the reduction in HP compressor pressure ratio and resulted in a net increase in core mass flow.

The higher-thrust GE90 variants are the first production engines to feature swept rotor blades. The nacelle has a maximum diameter of 166 in (4,200 mm). Each of the 22 fan blades on the GE90-115B measures 4 feet (1.2 meters) long and has a mass of less than 50 pounds (23 kilograms).

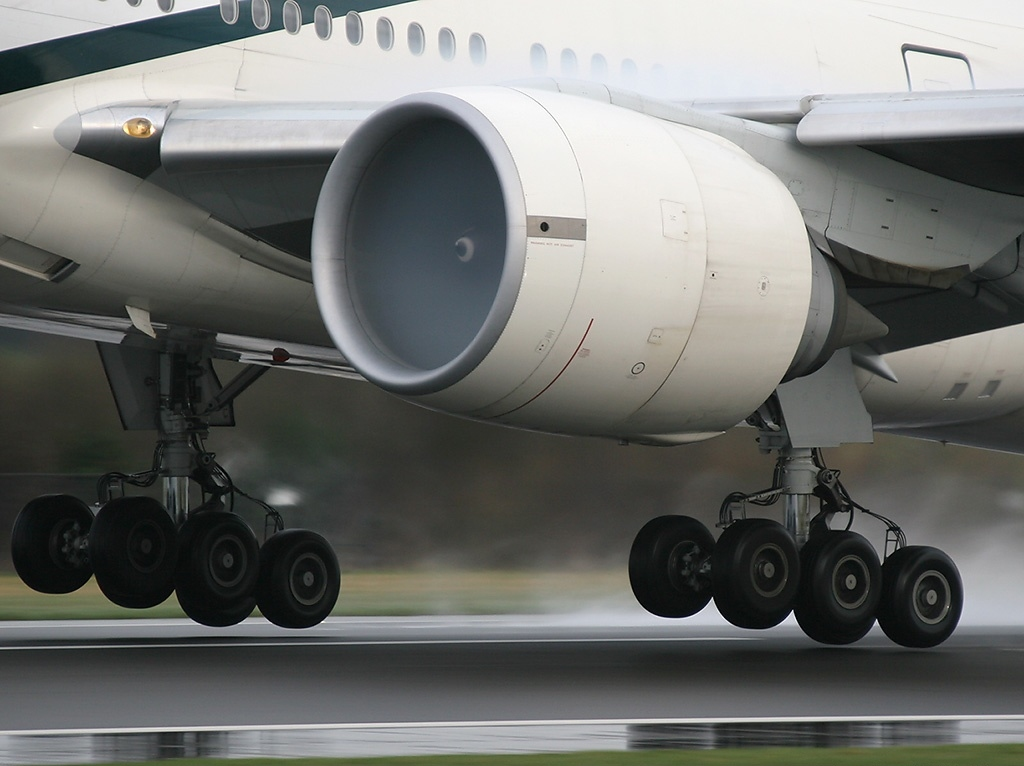
An original GE90-94B operating on a Pakistan International Airlines 777-200ER.

== Operational history ==
As one of the three available engines for the all-new Boeing 777 large twinjet airliner, the GE90 was an all-new $2 billion design in contrast to the offerings from Pratt & Whitney and Rolls-Royce, which were modifications of existing engines.

The first General Electric-powered Boeing 777 was delivered to British Airways on November 12, 1995. The aircraft, with two GE90-77Bs, entered service five days later. Initial service was affected by gearbox bearing wear concerns, which caused the airline to temporarily withdraw its 777 fleet from transatlantic service in 1997. British Airways' aircraft returned to full service later that year.

Problems with GE90 development and testing caused delays in Federal Aviation Administration certification. British Airways soon replaced the GE90 with the Rolls-Royce Trent 800 on their 777s. In addition, the GE90's increased thrust was not yet required by airlines, and it also was the heaviest engine of the three available choices, making it the least popular option on these first-generation 777s (777-200 and 777-200ER, also known as the 777 Classic), while the Rolls-Royce engine was the most popular.

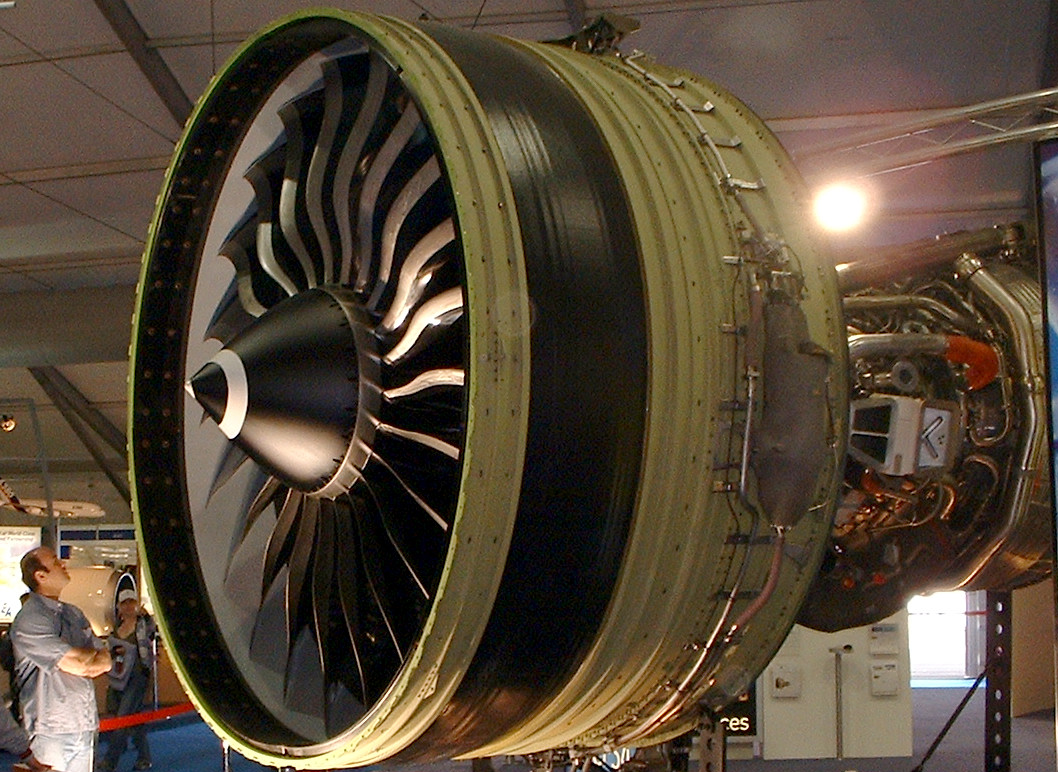
A GE90-115B engine

For Boeing's second-generation 777 long-range versions (777-200LR, 777-300ER, and 777F), greater thrust was needed to meet the aircraft requirements. General Electric and Pratt & Whitney insisted on a winner-take-all contract due to the $500 million investment in engine modifications needed to meet the requirements, with GE receiving sole engine-supplier status. The improved version entered service with Air France in May 2004.

The higher-thrust GE90-110B1 and -115B engines, in combination with the second-generation 777 variants -200LR and -300ER, were the primary reasons 777 sales exceeded those of its rival, the A340. Using two engines yields a typical operating cost advantage of around 8–9% for the -300ER over the A340-600. The 777-300ER was also seen as a 747-400 replacement amid rising fuel prices, given its 20% fuel burn advantage.

Until its derivative, the GE9X, was passed, the GE90 series held the title of the largest engines in aviation history. The fan diameter of the original series being 123 in (310 cm), and the largest variant GE90-115B has a fan diameter of 128 in (330 cm). As a result, the GE90 engine can be air-freighted using only an outsize cargo aircraft such as the Antonov An-124, which restricts shipping options if, due to an emergency diversion, a 777 were stranded needing an engine change. If the fan and fan case are removed, then the engine may be shipped using a 747 Freighter.

The -94B for the -200ER was retrofitted with some of the first FAA-approved 3D-printed components.

In 2011, its list price was US$27.5 million, and it had an in-flight shutdown rate (IFSD) of one per million engine flight-hours. Until November 2015, it had accumulated more than 8 million cycles and 50 million flight hours in 20 years. In July 2020, the fleet of 2,800 engines surpassed 100 million hours, powering over 1,200 aircraft for 70 operators with a dispatch reliability rate of 99.97%. A complete overhaul costs more than $12 million.

=== Records ===
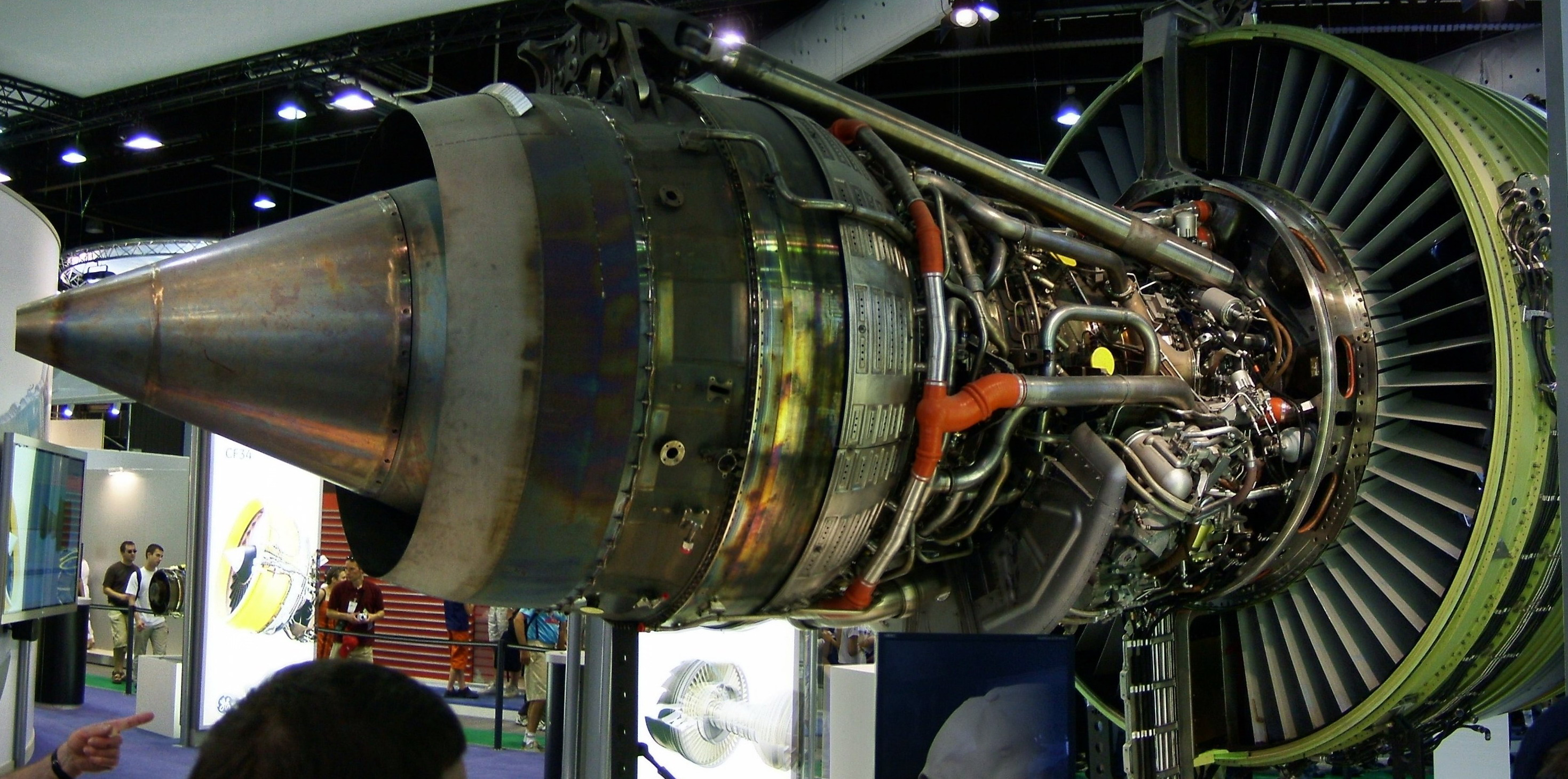
GE90 without cowling

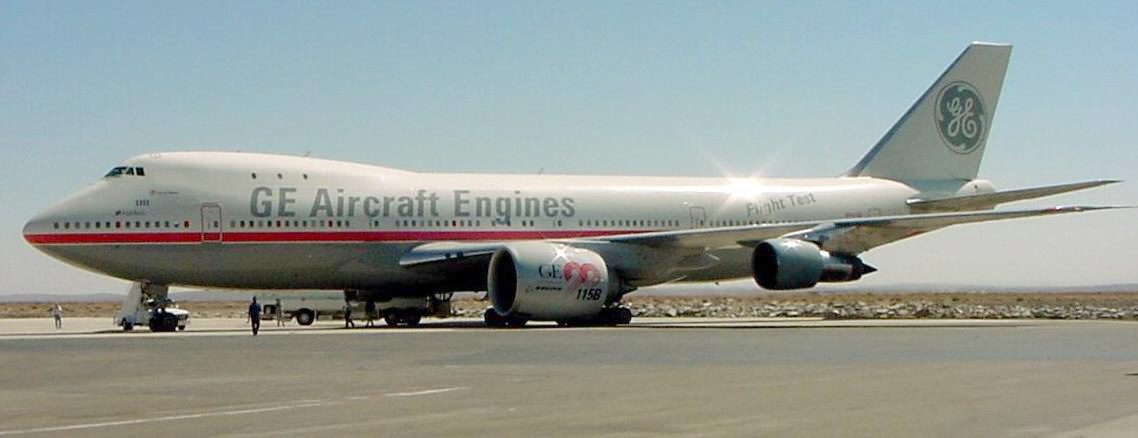
The higher-thrust GE90-115B mounted on N747GE, GE's Boeing 747 test aircraft.

The GE90-115B provided enough thrust to fly N747GE, GE's Boeing 747-100 flying testbed with the other three engines at idle, an attribute demonstrated during a flight test.

According to the Guinness Book of Records, at 127,900 lbf (569 kN), the engine held the record for the highest thrust achieved by an aircraft engine (the maximum thrust for the engine in service is its rated thrust, 115,300 lbf (513 kN)). This thrust record was reached inadvertently as part of a one-hour, triple-red-line engine stress test using a GE90-115B development engine at GE's outdoor test complex near Peebles, Ohio. It eclipsed the engine's previous Guinness world record of 122,965 lbf (546.98 kN). On November 10, 2017, its successor, the GE9X, reached a higher record thrust of 134,300 lbf (597 kN) in Peebles.

The initial GE90 fan shaft design loads were greatly increased for operational torque and the fan blade-off condition. To accommodate the increase in fan-shaft torsional and bending stresses, a steel alloy, GE1014, not previously used in aircraft engines, was required. A significantly longer fan shaft spline-coupling was required, and maintaining the required high machining accuracy was challenging.

In October 2003, the Boeing 777-300ER with GE90-115B engines was the first ever plane/engine configuration to be certified ETOPS 330. This allows flying routes where flying time to the nearest airport, with one engine shut down, could be as much as five and a half hours (330 minutes). That aircraft, with GE90-115B engines, flew from Seattle to Taiwan as part of this ETOPS certification program, with one engine shut down for 330 minutes during the approximately 13-hour flight.

On November 10, 2005, the GE90 entered the Guinness World Records for a second time. The GE90-110B1 powered a 777-200LR on the world's longest flight by a commercial airliner, though there were no fare-paying passengers; only journalists and guests. The 777-200LR flew 13,423 mi (21,602 km) in 22 hours, 22 minutes, flying from Hong Kong to London "the long way": over the Pacific, over the continental U.S., then over the Atlantic to London.

== Incidents ==
On August 11, 2004, a GE90-85B powering a Boeing 777-200ER on British Airways flight 2024 suffered an engine failure on takeoff from George Bush Intercontinental Airport Houston, Texas. The pilots noticed noise and vibration during takeoff, but continued the rotation. At 1500 ft AGL, they noticed smoke and haze in the cockpit, and the cabin crew advised that the cabin was filling with smoke. They returned to the airport for an emergency landing. The findings were that a stage 2 turbine blade had separated at its shank, damaging the trailing blades and causing the vibration. The debris was contained in the engine casing.

On May 28, 2012, an Air Canada 777-300ER taking off from Toronto en route to Tokyo experienced a GE90-115B failure at 1,500 feet (460 m) and returned safely. Engine debris was found on the ground.

On September 8, 2015, a GE90-85B powering a Boeing 777-236ER on British Airways Flight 2276 suffered an uncontained failure during take-off roll at Las Vegas McCarran Airport, leading to a fire.

On June 27, 2016, a GE90-115B powering a Boeing 777-300ER, on Singapore Airlines Flight 368, received an engine oil warning during flight and returned to Singapore Changi Airport. On landing, the malfunctioning right engine caught fire, causing damage to the engine and the wing.

=== Transfer gearbox failures ===
The FAA issued an Airworthiness Directive (AD) on May 16, 2013, and sent it to owners and operators of General Electric GE90-110B1 and GE90-115B turbofan engines. This emergency AD was prompted by reports of two failures of transfer gearbox assemblies (TGBs), which resulted in in-flight shutdowns (IFSDs). The investigation revealed that the failures were caused by cracking and separation of the TGB radial gear. Further inspections found two additional radial gears with cracks. If not corrected, this condition could result in additional IFSDs of one or more engines, loss of thrust control, and damage to the airplane. The Airworthiness Directive requires compliance by taking remedial measures within five days of receipt of the AD. All affected modules have been replaced.

== Specifications ==
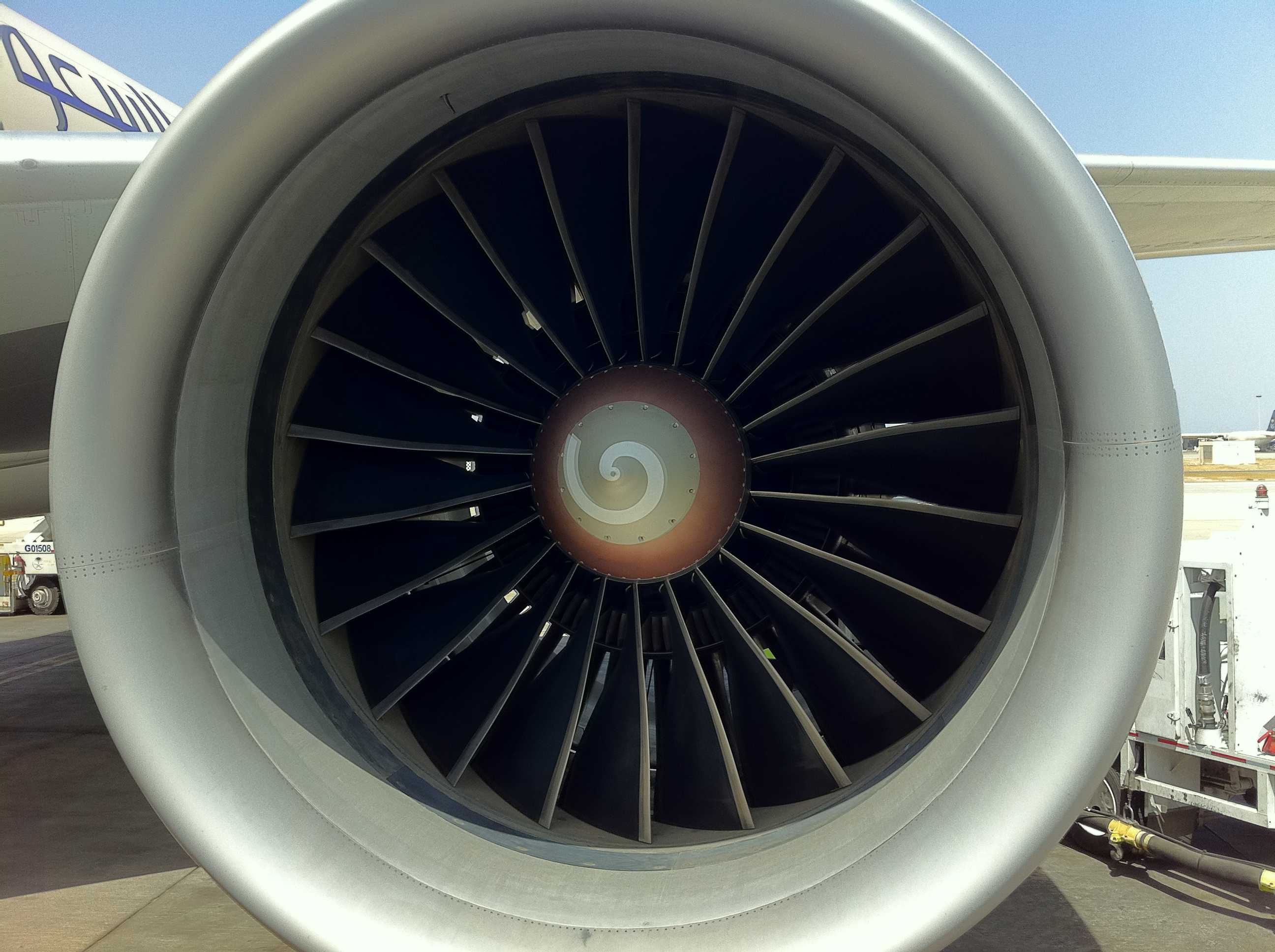
A GE90-94B (Boeing 777-200ER), straight fan blades

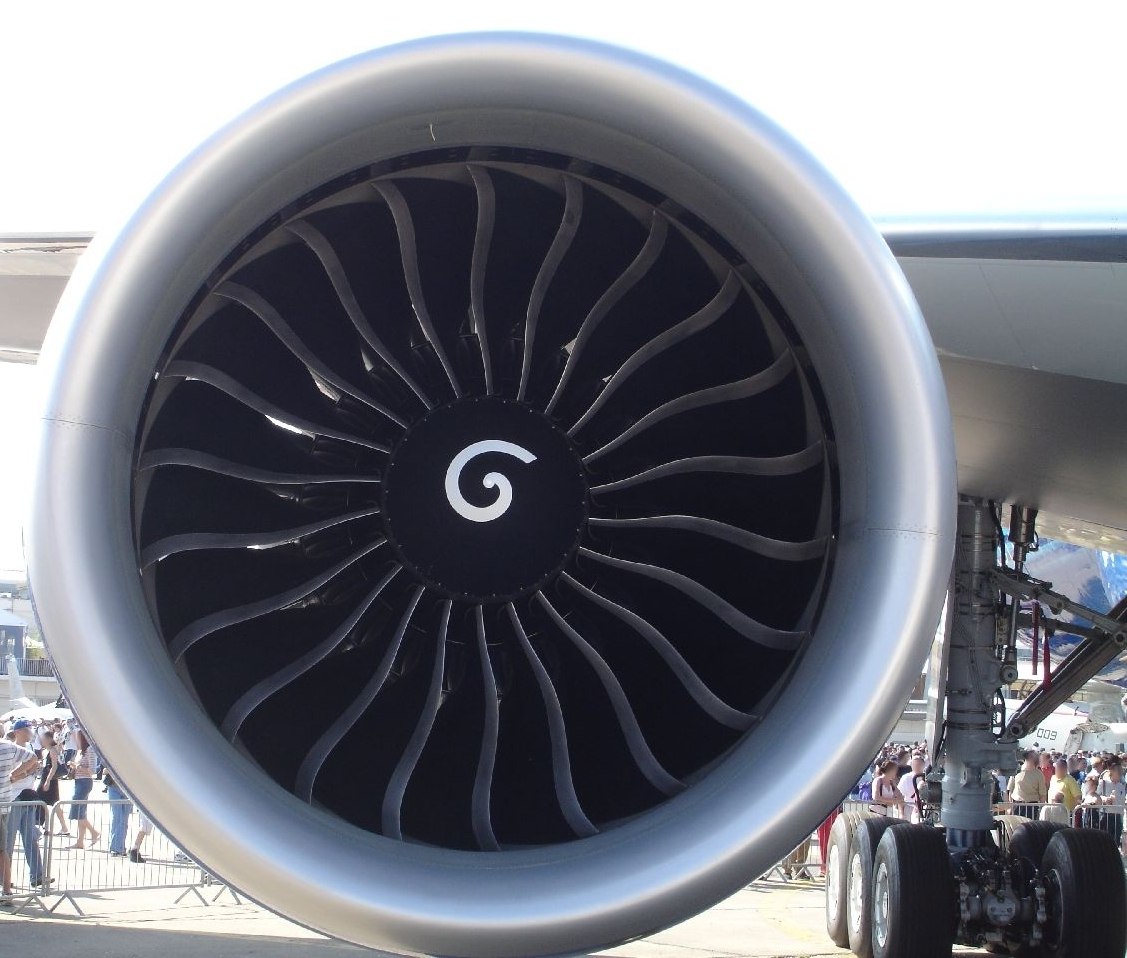
A GE90-110B1 (Boeing 777-200LR), curved fan blades

GE90 Type Certificate Datasheet
Variant	-76B/-77B/-85B/-90B/-94B	-110B1/-113B/-115B
Type	Dual rotor, axial flow, high bypass turbofan	
Compressor	1 fan, 3-stage LP, 10-stage HP	1 fan, 4-stage LP, 9-stage HP
Turbine	2-stage HP, 6-stage LP	
Length (Note: Fan spinner to nozzle centerbody)	286.9 in (7.29 m)	286.67 in (7.281 m)
Max. width	152.4 in (3.87 m)	148.38 in (3.769 m)
Max. height	155.6 in (3.95 m)	154.56 in (3.926 m)
Fan diameter	123 in (3.1 m)	128 in (3.3 m)
Weight (Note: Dry, Includes basic engine, basic engine accessories, and optional equipment)	17,400 lb (7,893 kg)	19,316 lb (8,762 kg)
Takeoff thrust	81,070–97,300 lbf (360.6–432.8 kN)	110,760–115,540 lbf (492.7–513.9 kN) (Note: world record set at 127,900 lbf (569 kN) in testing 827 feet above sea level)
LP rotor speed	2,261.5 rpm	2,355 rpm
HP rotor speed	9,332 rpm	
Air mass flow	Static: 1350 kg/s Cruise: 576 kg/s	
Specific thrust	Static: 278.1 m/s Cruise: 120.1 m/s	
Bypass ratio	8.4–9	9
Pressure ratio	40:1	42:1
Thrust-to-weight ratio	5.59	5.98
Takeoff TSFC	0.278 lb/lbf/h (7.9 g/kN/s)	
Cruise TSFC	0.545 lb/lbf/h (15.4 g/kN/s) (-76B) (-85B) or 0.520 lb/lbf/h (14.7 g/kN/s) (-85B)	

== Derivatives ==
=== GEnx ===
The GEnx engine, developed for the Boeing 787 Dreamliner and 747-8, is derived from a smaller core variant of the GE90 and also features swept rotor blades.

=== GP7000 ===
GE Aviation set up a cooperative venture with Pratt & Whitney, named Engine Alliance, under which the companies have developed an engine for the Airbus A380, being the GP7000, based on the GE90-110B/115B core.

=== GE9X ===
In February 2012, GE announced studies on a 10% more efficient derivative, dubbed the GE9X, to power the new Boeing 777X series.

=== LM9000 ===
The LM9000 is an aeroderivative gas turbine available in two options: the LM9000 without water augmentation, outputting 66 MW (89,000 hp) at a 42.4% efficiency before cogeneration, and the LM9000 with water augmentation, outputting 75 MW (101,000 hp) at a 42.7% efficiency before cogeneration. The engine's 33:1 pressure ratio is achieved by a 4-stage low-pressure compressor followed by a 9-stage high-pressure compressor, driven by a 2-stage high-pressure turbine and a 1-stage low-pressure turbine, which in turn powers a 4-stage free turbine.

== See also ==
Related development

- General Electric GEnx
- Engine Alliance GP7000
- General Electric GE9X
- General Electric LM9000

Comparable engines

- Pratt & Whitney PW4000
- Rolls-Royce Trent 800
- Rolls-Royce Trent XWB

Related lists

- List of aircraft engines
