= N7001U =

Preserved Boeing 727 aircraft

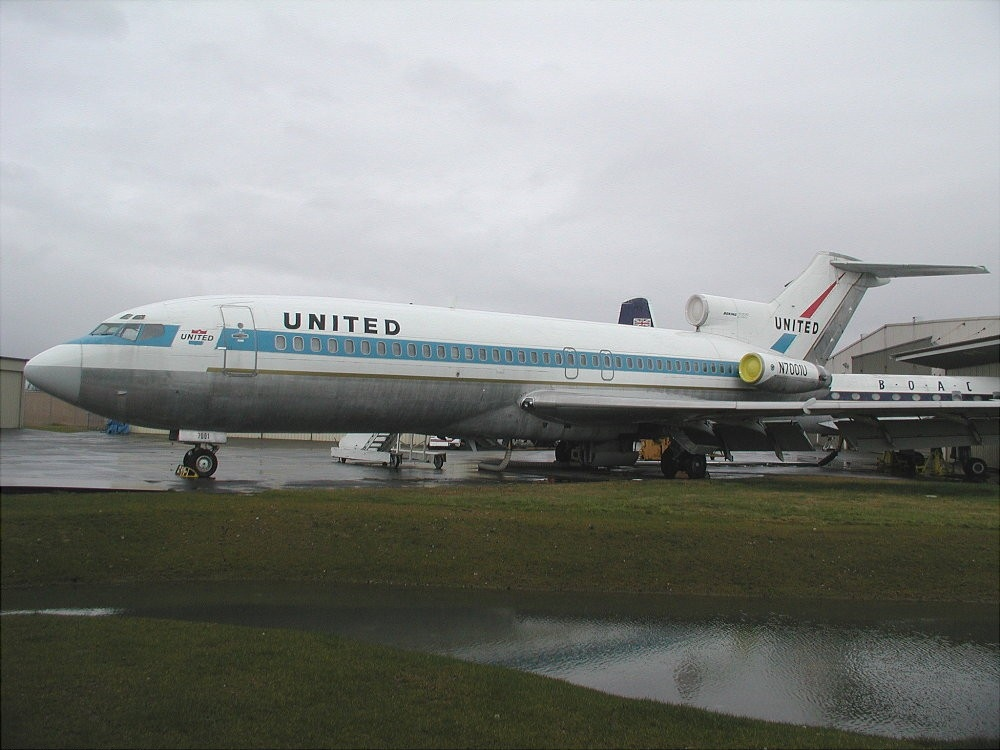

General information
- Type: Boeing 727-22 (Note: The aircraft is a Boeing 727-100 model; until 2016, Boeing assigned a unique code for each company that bought one of its aircraft, which was applied as a suffix to the model number at the time the aircraft was built, hence "727-22" designates a 727-100 built to United Airlines' specifications (customer code 22).)
- Manufacturer: Boeing
- Owners: United Airlines
- Registration: N7001U
- Flights: 48,060
- Total hours: 64,495

History
- Manufactured: November 27, 1962
- First flight: February 9, 1963
- Last flight: March 2, 2016
- Preserved at: Museum of Flight in Seattle, Washington.
- Fate: On static display

N7001U is the first production Boeing 727-100 to be built by Boeing in 1962. It was delivered to United Airlines in 1964, and spent its entire service career with the airline until its retirement in 1991.

== History ==
=== Construction and rollout ===
On November 27, 1962, N7001U was rolled out of the Boeing factory in Renton, Washington. It bore a lemon yellow and copper-brown paint scheme, reminiscent of the Boeing 367-80 prototype of 1954.

=== Maiden flight and service ===
N7001U took to the skies for the first time on February 9, 1963. After completing the flight test and certification program, it was delivered to United Air Lines on October 6, 1964. United operated N7001U for 27 years, accumulating 64,495 flight hours and executing 48,060 takeoffs and landings during its time in service. In 1991, United Air Lines donated the aircraft to The Museum of Flight in Seattle, Washington. Over its years of service, N7001U carried approximately three million passengers.

=== Final flight and legacy ===
On March 2, 2016, after extensive restoration, N7001U made its final flight from Paine Field near Everett, Washington to the museum's facility at Boeing Field. The aircraft was a notable exception to Boeing's practice of retaining first production examples of its jet airliners for testing and development; not until the Boeing 777 of the 1990s would such an aircraft see regular airline service. (Note: N7771, the first Boeing 777 to be built, was delivered to Cathay Pacific in 2000.)
