= Museum of Flight =

Air and space museum in Seattle

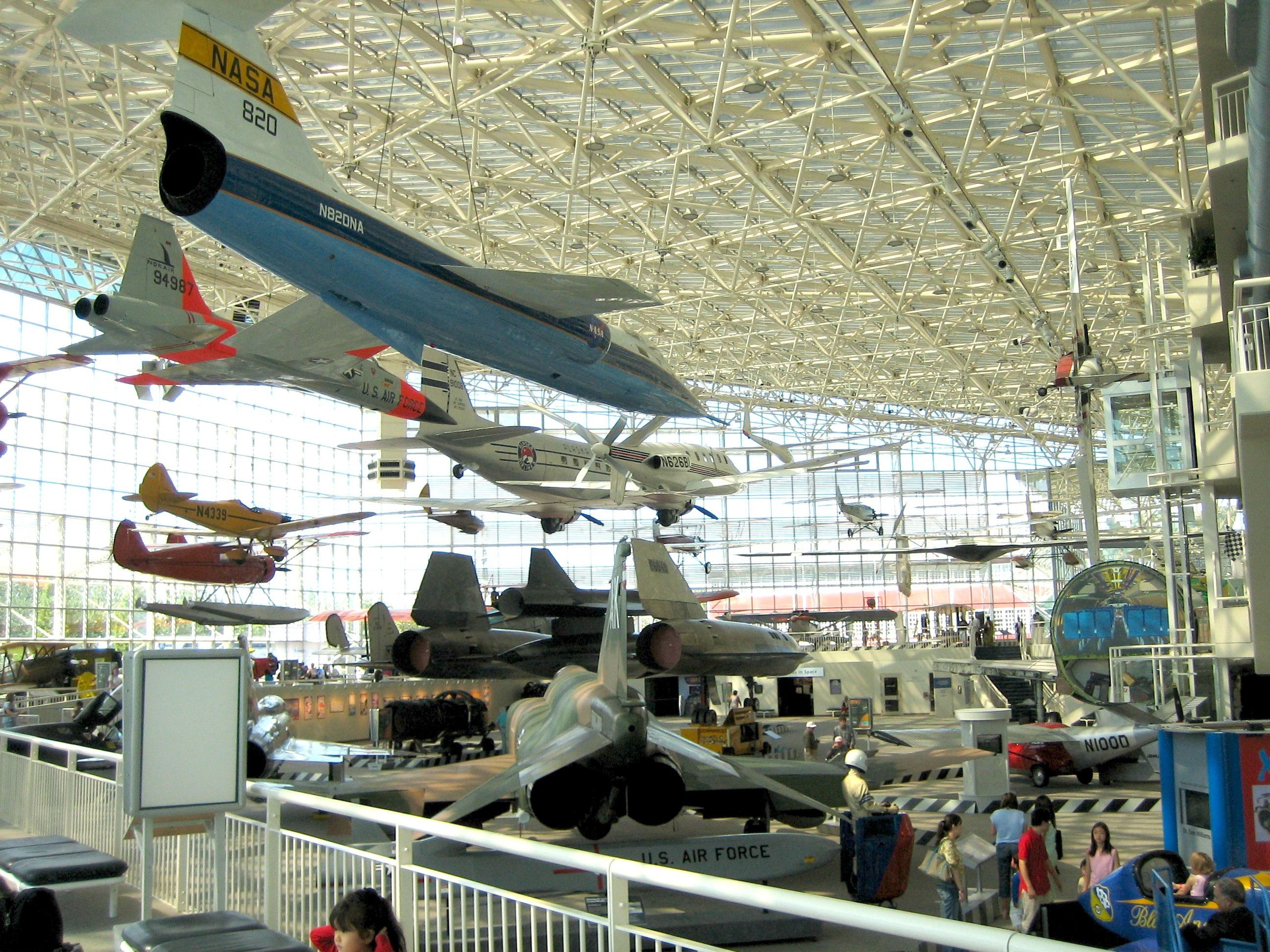
- The museum's Great Gallery in 2005
- Former name: Pacific Museum of Flight
- Established: 1965; 61 years ago
- Location: Boeing Field; 9404 East Marginal Way S. Seattle, Washington, U.S.
- Coordinates: 47°31′05″N 122°17′49″W
- Type: Aviation museum
- Visitors: 465,504 (2024)
- President: Matthew B. Hayes
- Curator: Matthew Burchette
- Public transit access: King County Metro
- Website: museumofflight.org

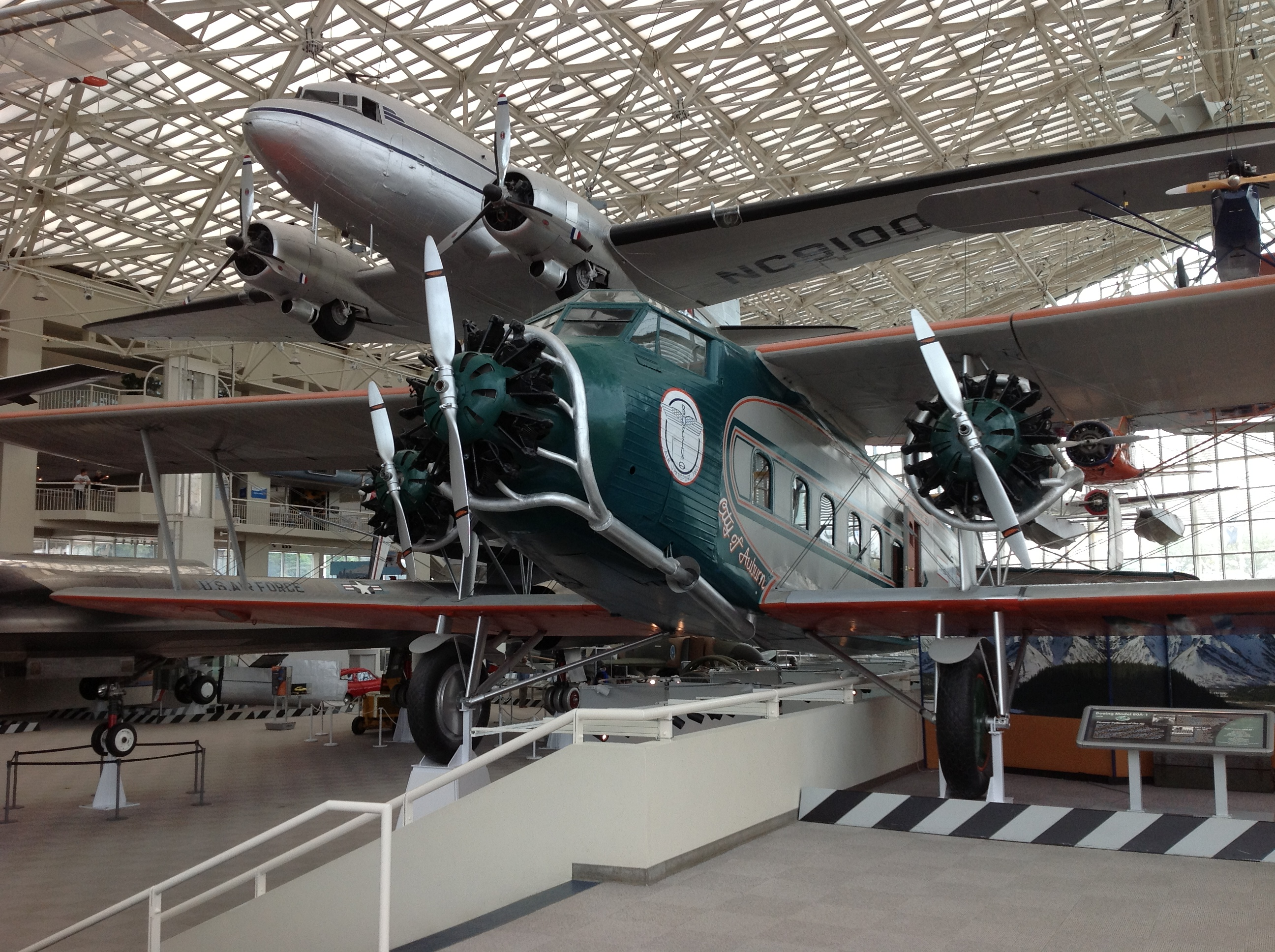
The Boeing Model 80A-1

The Museum of Flight is a private non-profit air and space museum in the Seattle metropolitan area of Washington in the United States. It is located at the southern end of King County International Airport (Boeing Field) in the city of Tukwila, immediately south of Seattle. It was established in 1965 and is the largest private air and space museum in the world. The Museum of Flight is fully accredited by the American Alliance of Museums.

The museum had over 465,000 visitors in 2024 and over 11,000 members. It had $27 million in operating revenues and a total endowment value of $72.9 million in 2024. The museum also serves more than 140,000 students annually through its onsite programs: a Challenger Learning Center, an Aviation Learning Center, and a summer camp (ACE), as well as outreach programs that travel throughout Washington and Oregon.

== History ==
The Museum of Flight can trace its roots back to the Pacific Northwest Aviation Historical Foundation, which was founded in 1965 to recover and restore a 1929 Boeing 80A-1, which had been discovered in Anchorage, Alaska. The restoration took place over a 16-year period, and after completion, was put on display as a centerpiece for the museum. In 1968, the name "Museum of Flight" first appeared in use in a 10,000 sq ft (900 m^{2}) facility, rented at the Seattle Center. Planning began at this time for a more permanent structure, and preliminary concepts were drafted.

In 1975, The William E. Boeing Red Barn was acquired for one dollar from the Port of Seattle, which had taken possession of it after Boeing abandoned it during World War II. The 1909 all-wooden Red Barn, the original home of the company, was barged two miles (3 km) up the Duwamish River to its current location at the southwestern end of Boeing Field. Fundraising was slow in the late 1970s, and after restoration, the two-story Red Barn was opened to the public in 1983.

That year a funding campaign was launched, so capital could be raised for construction of the T.A. Wilson Great Gallery. In 1987, Vice President George Bush, joined by four Mercury astronauts, cut the ribbon to open the facility on July 10, with an expansive volume of 3,000,000 cubic feet (85,000 m^{3}). The gallery's structure is built in a space frame lattice structure and holds more than 20 hanging aircraft, including a Douglas DC-3 weighing more than nine tons. The glass roof was designed by structural engineer Jack Christiansen, who also worked on the Kingdome roof.

The museum's education programs grew significantly with the building of a Challenger Learning Center in 1992. This interactive exhibit allows students to experience a Space Shuttle mission. It includes a mock-up NASA mission control, and experiments from all areas of space research.

Completed in 1994, the 132-seat Wings Cafe and the 250-seat Skyline multipurpose banquet and meeting room increased the museum's footprint to 185,000 square feet (17,200 m^{2}). At the same time, one of the museum's most widely recognized and popular artifacts, the Lockheed M-21, a modified Lockheed A-12 Oxcart designed to carry the Lockheed D-21 reconnaissance drones, was placed on the floor at the center of the Great Gallery, after being fully restored.

The first jet-powered Air Force One (1959–1962, SAM 970), a Boeing VC-137B, was flown to Boeing Field in 1996; it arrived in June and was opened to visitors in October. Retired from active service earlier that year, it is on loan from the Air Force Museum. Originally parked on the east side of the museum, it was driven across East Marginal Way and now resides in the museum's Aviation Pavilion, where it is open to public walkthroughs.

In 1997, the museum opened the first full scale, interactive Air Traffic Control tower exhibit. The tower overlooks the Boeing Field runways, home to one of the thirty busiest general aviation airports in the country. The exhibit offers a glimpse into what it is like to be an air traffic controller.

The next major expansion was opened in 2004, with the addition of the J. Elroy McCaw Personal Courage Wing, named after J. Elroy McCaw, an area businessman, entrepreneur and World War II veteran. North of the Red Barn, the wing has 88,000 square feet (8,200 m^{2}) of exhibit space on two floors, with more than 25 World War I and World War II aircraft. It also has large collection of model aircraft, including every plane from both wars. Many of these aircraft were from the collection of the Champlin Fighter Museum, formerly in Mesa, Arizona, which closed in 2003. The wing opened on June 6, the sixtieth anniversary of D-Day.

In June 2010, the museum broke ground on a $12 million new building to house a Space Shuttle it hoped to receive from NASA, named the Charles Simonyi Space Gallery. The new building includes multisensory exhibits that emphasize stories from the visionaries, designers, pilots, and crews of the Space Shuttle and other space related missions. The gallery opened to the public in November 2012.

Though the museum did not receive one of the four remaining Shuttles, it did receive the Full Fuselage Trainer (FFT), a Shuttle mockup that was used to train all Space Shuttle astronauts. Because it is a trainer and not an actual Shuttle, guided tours of the interior are available, for an extra charge. The FFT began arriving in various pieces beginning in 2012. The cockpit and two sections of the payload bay arrived via NASA's Super Guppy.

During the 50th anniversary celebrations for Apollo 11 in 2019, the Museum of Flight hosted a traveling Smithsonian exhibit with the Apollo Command module Columbia, which was used during the first Moon landing.

== Aircraft on display ==
The Museum of Flight has more than 150 aircraft in its collection, including:

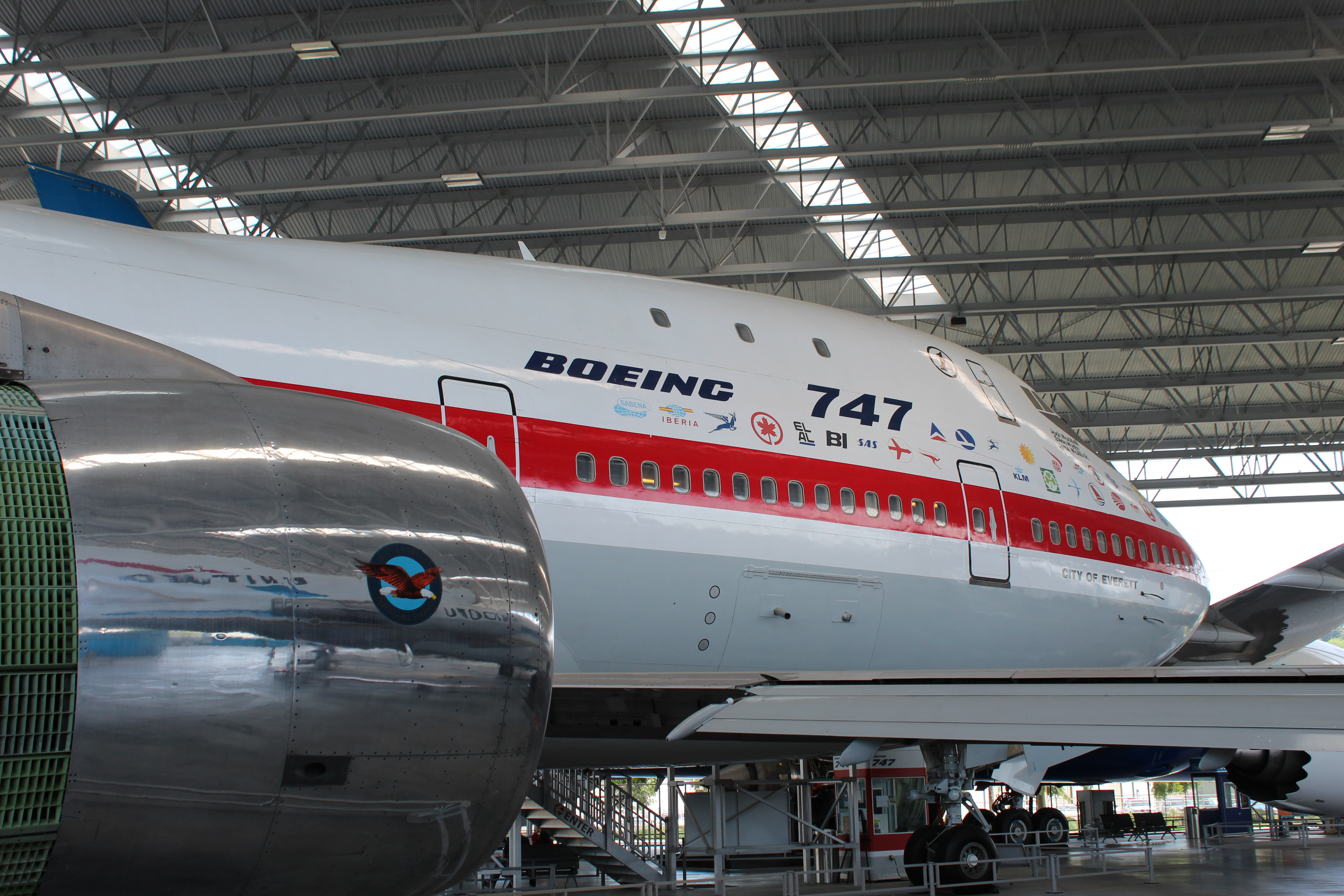
Boeing 747 prototype City of Everett at the Aviation Pavilion

Boeing 747
the first flight-worthy B747, City of Everett. Its registration number is N7470, and it was named after the city of Everett, Washington. Its first flight was on February 9, 1969, and was retired in 1990. (Open for walkthrough)
Boeing VC-137B SAM 970
the first presidential jet, which served in the presidential fleet from 1959 to 1996 (open for walkthrough)

A British Airways Concorde tail (G-BOAG) at the Aviation Pavilion

Concorde 214
(British Airways), registration G-BOAG (open for walkthrough). This is one of only four Concordes on display outside Europe, with the other three being near Washington, in New York, and in Barbados. One of the engines from G-BOAG was sold at auction in 2023 to a bidder for $728,240.
Caproni Ca.20
the world's first fighter plane from World War I. The one on display at the Museum of Flight was the only one ever built.
de Havilland Comet
the world's first jet airliner. First flew 1949, in production 1952 to 1964. This is currently stored at their restoration center at Paine Field in Everett.
Lockheed Model 10-E Electra
restored by pilot Linda Finch to match the aircraft Amelia Earhart was piloting when she disappeared over the Pacific Ocean
Lockheed D-21
Unmanned reconnaissance drone, displayed mounted on the M-21
Lockheed M-21
the sole surviving M-21 a variant of the Lockheed A-12.
Lockheed SR-71 Blackbirds
the surviving cockpit section of 61-7977, an SR-71 that crashed in 1968 and another complete unit.
Boeing 737
the prototype Boeing 737-100, formerly operated by NASA as NASA 515.
Boeing 787 Dreamliner
N787BX, the third 787-8 prototype. Open for walkthroughs.
Lockheed Martin RQ-3 DarkStar
the second DarkStar UAV prototype

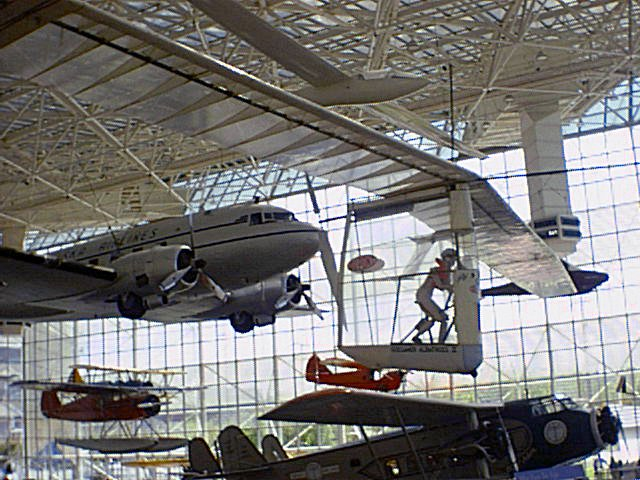
Gossamer Albatross II at the Museum of Flight

MacCready Gossamer Albatross II
human-powered aircraft.
Aerocar International's Aerocar
one of five surviving Aerocars, (automobiles with detachable wings and propeller).
LearAvia Lear Fan
prototype N626BL
Douglas DC-2
one of only two remaining airworthy DC-2s.
Boeing 80A
the only surviving 80A, flown by Bob Reeve in Alaska.
Boeing 727-100 (E1)
An ex-United Airlines B727-100, The Original Prototype.
Lockheed L-1049G Super Constellation
An ex-Trans-Canada Air Lines Super Constellation, located originally at the Toronto Pearson International Airport which was purchased in a controversial transaction in 2005. It is currently on display at the airpark.
Lamson L-106 Alcor
the world's first pressurized sailplane.
Boeing B-52 Stratofortress
an ex US Air Force B-52-G that was nicknamed "Midnight Express". It was manufactured in 1960 and was in service during the Vietnam War. The aircraft was restored by the Museum of Flight and put on display in 2019.
Boeing B-29 Superfortress
the Museum of Flight's B-29 Superfortress known as T-Square 54 was an active military aircraft in the Pacific theater of World War II. It flew roughly 37 combat missions. It was part of the 875th Bomb Squadron and later the 498th Bomb Group. Post World War II the aircraft served in the Korean War. During the war the Aircraft was converted into an Aerial Refueling platform. After the war the Aircraft spent its retirement in China before being restored in 1986 and put on display in the Museum of Flight in 1994.
MiG-15
a former People's Liberation Army Air Force unit from the People's Republic of China that was acquired in 1990 by a private collector and donated to the museum in 2003.
Boeing B-17 Flying Fortress
built in 1943 and retired in 1945. It was used as a civilian tanker, a war memorial, and a prop plane for films until its donation and eventual restoration in 1991.
Boeing B-47 Stratojet
built in 1951 and served as part of the Strategic Air Command (SAC) from 1953 until 1963. It was retired in 1969 and delivered to the museum for display.

== Exhibits and facilities ==
The Museum of Flight is divided into two campuses that span a total of 23.5 acres (9.5 ha) adjacent to Boeing Field in northern Tukwila. The East Campus is home to the Great Gallery, a display of over 50 historic aircraft with education centers and flight simulators. The building also has the museum's lobby, theater, cafe, and an observation tower that faces the runway at Boeing Field. The Personal Courage Wing (PCW) on the East Campus comprises 28 World War I and World War II aircraft from several countries including Germany, Russia, and Japan.

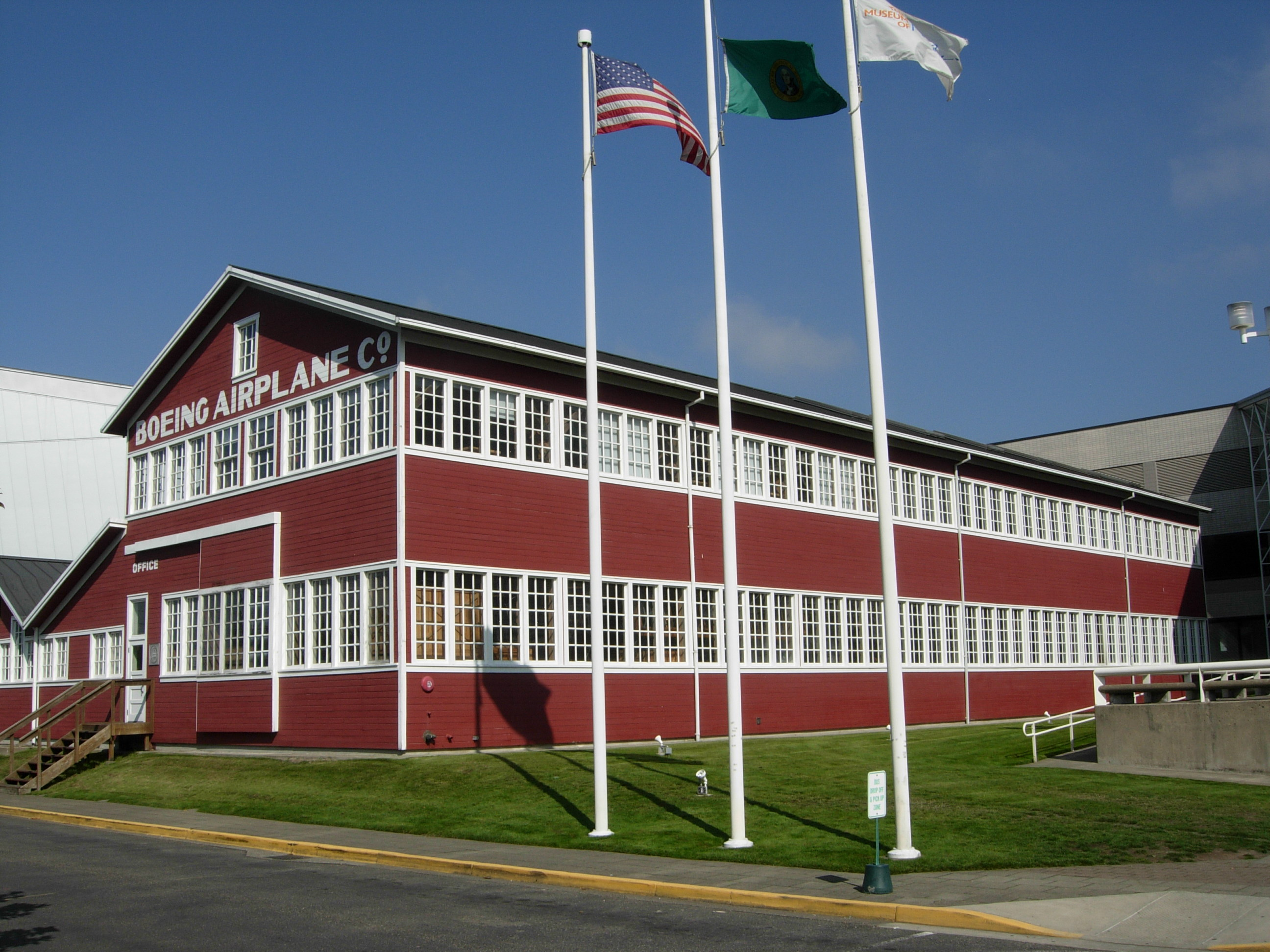
The Red Barn, Boeing's original manufacturing plant

The "Red Barn", the original manufacturing plant for Boeing in the early 20th century, is also on the East Campus. Also known as Building No. 105, it was built in 1909 and has been designated a historic site. Through photographs, film, oral histories, and restoration of work stations the exhibits in the Red Barn illustrate how wooden aircraft structure with fabric overlays were manufactured in the early years of aviation and provides a history of aviation development through 1958.

In June 2007, the museum opened a new space exhibit: "Space: Exploring the New Frontier", which traces the evolution of space flight from the times of Robert Goddard to the present and into future commercial spaceflight.

The West Campus is connected to the rest of the museum by a skybridge that crosses over East Marginal Way and leads into the Space Gallery, which houses a Space Shuttle trainer exhibit. The adjacent Aviation Pavilion spans 3 acres (1.2 ha) with 19 commercial and military aircraft under a large roof. These include the first or prototype versions of the Boeing 727, Boeing 737, and Boeing 747, as well as the B-17 Flying Fortress and B-29 Superfortress. A Concorde supersonic aircraft once used by British Airways is also on display inside the building.

In late May 2019, the museum opened the Vietnam Veterans' Memorial Park featuring the fully restored B-52G Stratofortess Midnight Express (59-2584) as the culmination of Project Welcome Home. Just west of the Aviation Pavilion, the park is free to the public.

=== Restoration facility ===
The museum maintains a restoration facility at Paine Field in Everett with about 39 ongoing projects including a de Havilland Comet 4 jet airliner, a Jetstar, and the Boeing 2707 mockup, among many.

=== Museum of Flight Library and Archives ===
The Harl V. Brackin Library at the Museum of Flight was founded in 1985. As of 2011, it contains 66,000 books and subscribes to 100 periodicals; specializing in aerospace and aviation, it has an online catalog.

The Museum of Flight Archives is accessible to the public via the Kenneth H. Dahlberg Research Center. It includes millions of photographs and thousands of linear feet of manuscript materials. Highlights of the collections include the Gordon S. Williams photographic collection, the Peter M. Bowers Photographic Collection, the David D. Hatfield Aviation History Collection, the Norm Taylor Photographic Collection, the Elrey B. Jeppesen Aviation History and Navigation Collection, the American Fighter Aces Association Archives, the Lear Corporation Archives, and the Wright Airplane Company Collection.

In December 2017, the Archives launched a digital repository. The site features digitized materials from archival, library, and artifact collections. In April 2019 the Archives began to make archival collections available and searchable online.

=== Other facilities ===
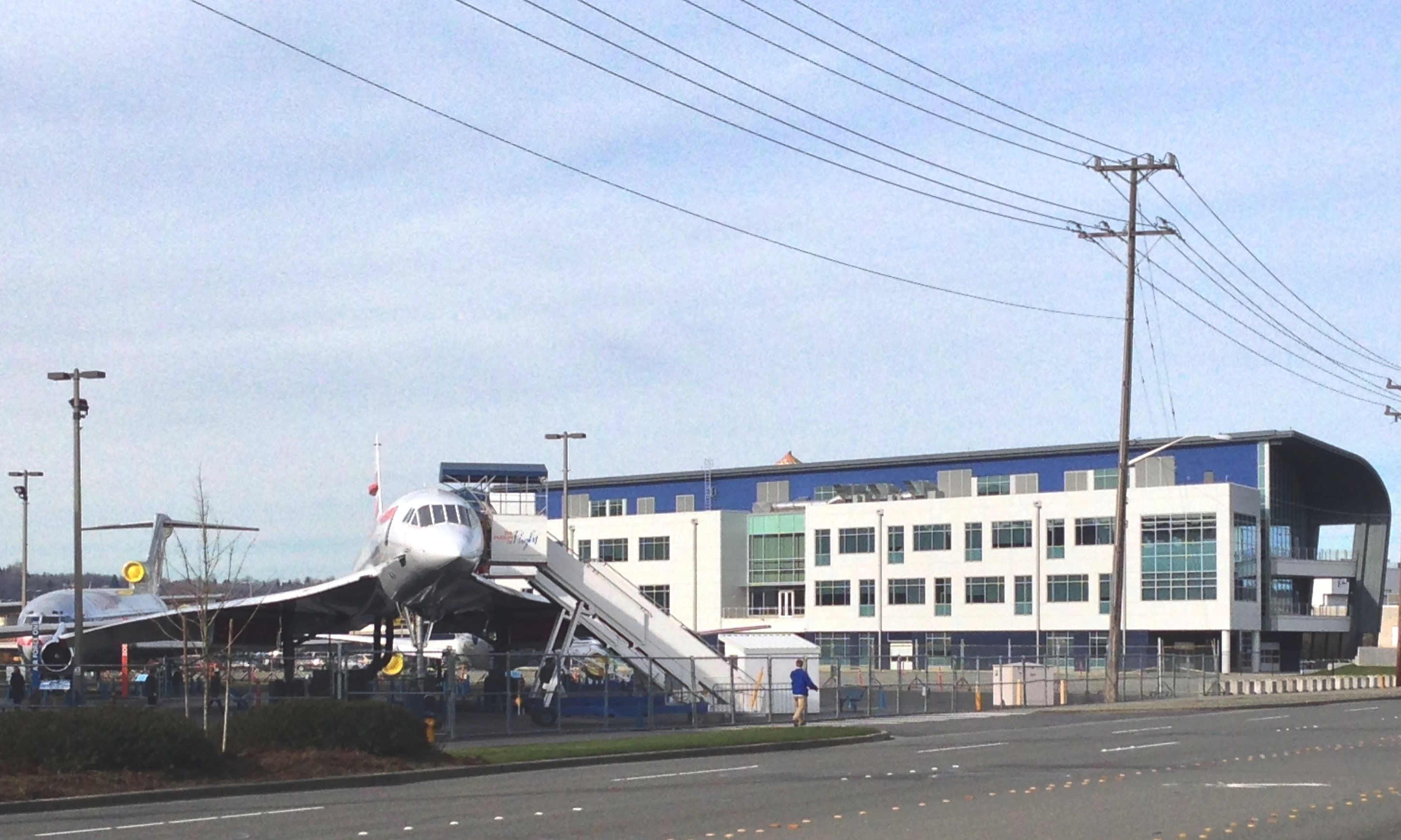
The Airpark's Concorde in the foreground and Raisbeck Aviation High School in the background, 2014

In September 2013, Raisbeck Aviation High School (formerly Aviation High School) opened in a new facility directly north of the museum's Aviation Pavilion. The school is operated by Highline Public Schools as a STEM school with a focus on aviation. The school operates in partnership with the museum (which owns the land), Boeing, and other members of the local aviation industry. The facility is also used for the museum's summer education programs when school is not in session.

== See also ==
- List of aerospace museums
