= City of Everett (aircraft) =

Preserved prototype of the Boeing 747

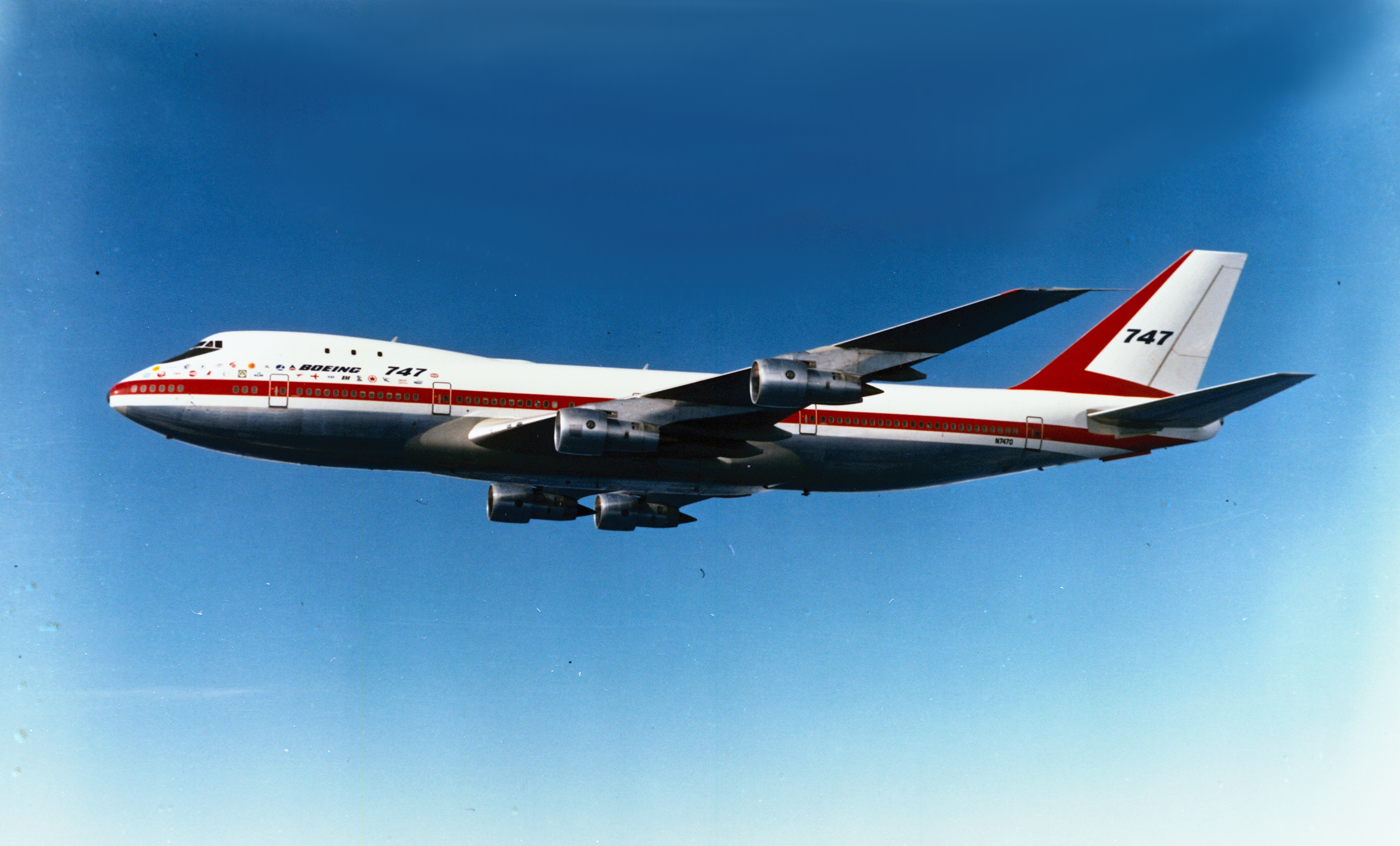

General information
- Other name: RA001
- Type: Boeing 747-121 (Note: The 1 in the suffix denotes that it was a -100 series variant of the 747; 21 is the Boeing customer code for Pan Am, however the aircraft was never delivered.)
- Manufacturer: Boeing
- Registration: N7470
- Total hours: 5,208

History
- Manufactured: September 30, 1968
- First flight: February 9, 1969
- In service: 1969–1990
- Last flight: April 6, 1995
- Preserved at: Museum of Flight in Seattle, Washington
- Fate: On display

The "City of Everett", is a Boeing 747, registered as N7470, that was built by Boeing to be the prototype for the Boeing 747-100. The aircraft rolled off the assembly line on September 30, 1968, and had its first flight on February 9, 1969. After the conclusion of the 747-flight testing program, Boeing retained the aircraft, using it for research and testing purposes until the early 1990s. The aircraft took its final flight on April 6, 1995, to the Museum of Flight in Seattle, Washington where it remains on display.

== History ==
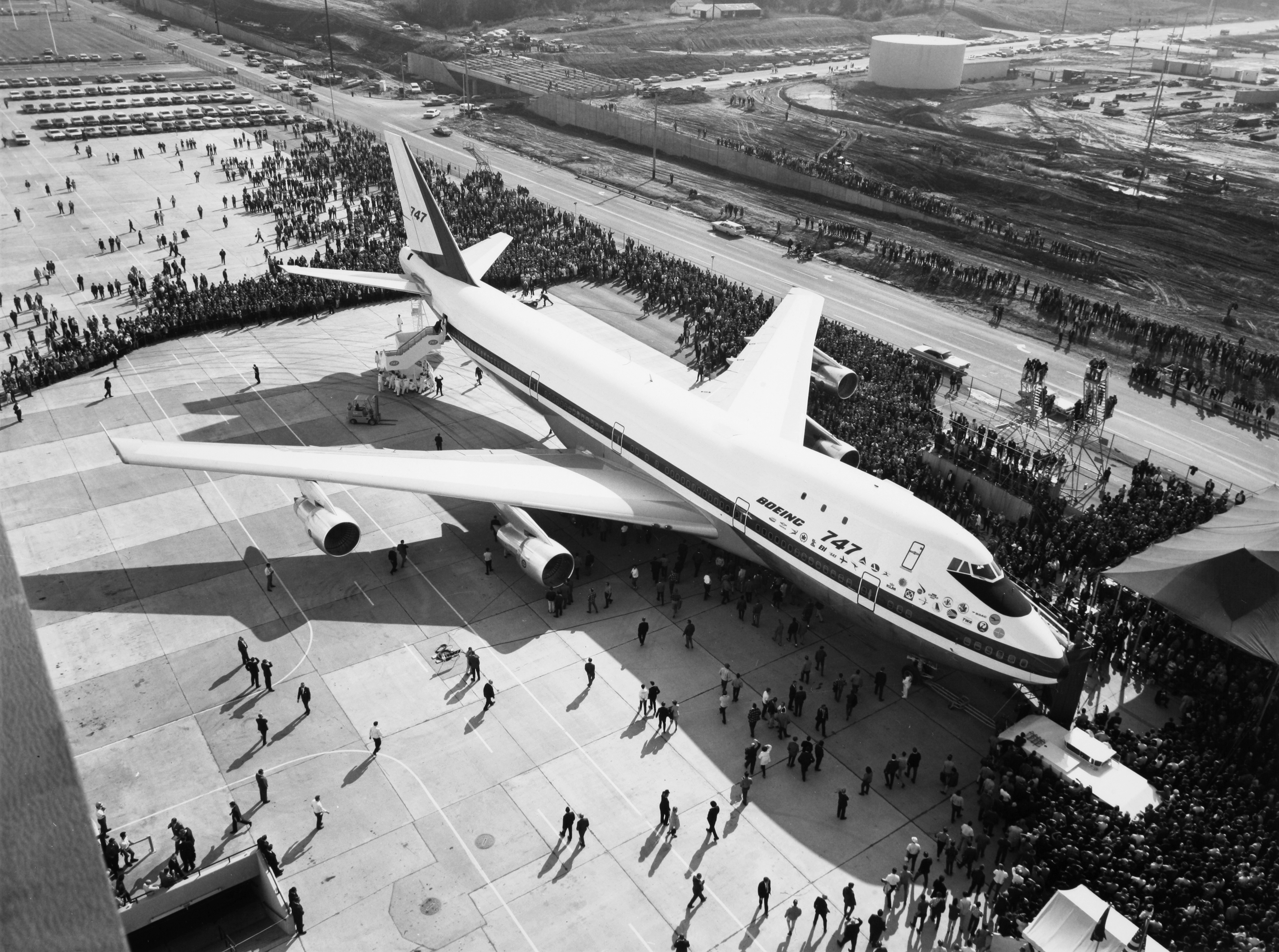
N7470 "City of Everett" being displayed to the public for the first time.

=== Birth of the Jumbo Jet ===
On September 30, 1968, the Boeing 747-100 prototype, registered as N7470 had rolled off the production line at the Boeing Everett Factory, a massive building that was constructed to build the 747 and was built almost simultaneously with the aircraft. The aircraft carried manufacturer serial number 20235 and was designated internally as RA001, marking the beginning of the era of the "jumbo jet".

N7470 has a paint design featuring a simple white and red livery adorned with the logos of 26 airlines who ordered the aircraft type.

Given its origin from the Everett production factory, Boeing nicknamed the aircraft the "City of Everett."

=== Certification flights ===
Although N7470 was publicly revealed in September 1968, it didn't take to the skies until February 9, 1969. The inaugural flight was piloted by Boeing Chief Test Pilot Jack Wadell, accompanied by Engineering Test Pilot Brien Singleton Wygle and Flight Engineer Jesse Arthur Wallick. This historic test flight marked the beginning of the Boeing 747's journey. N7470 continued its test flying duties until the type was certified by the Federal Aviation Administration (FAA) on December 30, 1969.

=== Use as Boeing testbed ===
After the 747 test flights, Boeing re-registered the aircraft as N1352B in July 1970 to explore missions beyond its original design specifications. These missions were primarily military, including using N1352B as a refuelling tanker for the Lockheed SR-71 Blackbird and the Boeing B-52 Stratofortress. Unfortunately, the idea of using the Boeing 747 as a refuelling tanker wasn't ideal, and the aircraft was eventually re-registered back to its original identity as N7470.

The plane was stored in Las Vegas between October 1983 and August 1986, when it was sent to Wichita where it was used as a mockup for the development of the Boeing VC-25, the aircraft commonly associated with Air Force One.

The aircraft also served as a testbed for the Pratt & Whitney PW4000 turbofan during its development for the Boeing 777.

Boeing retained ownership of N7470 over its entire lifetime in service, never being delivered to a customer and never being used in commercial service. The aircraft only accumulated about 5,200 hours of flight time over its lifetime, relatively low compared to a commercial aircraft which typically sees 3,000 to 4,000 hours every year. However, the aircraft was subjected to more extreme conditions including repeated stalls and dives.

=== Retirement and preservation ===
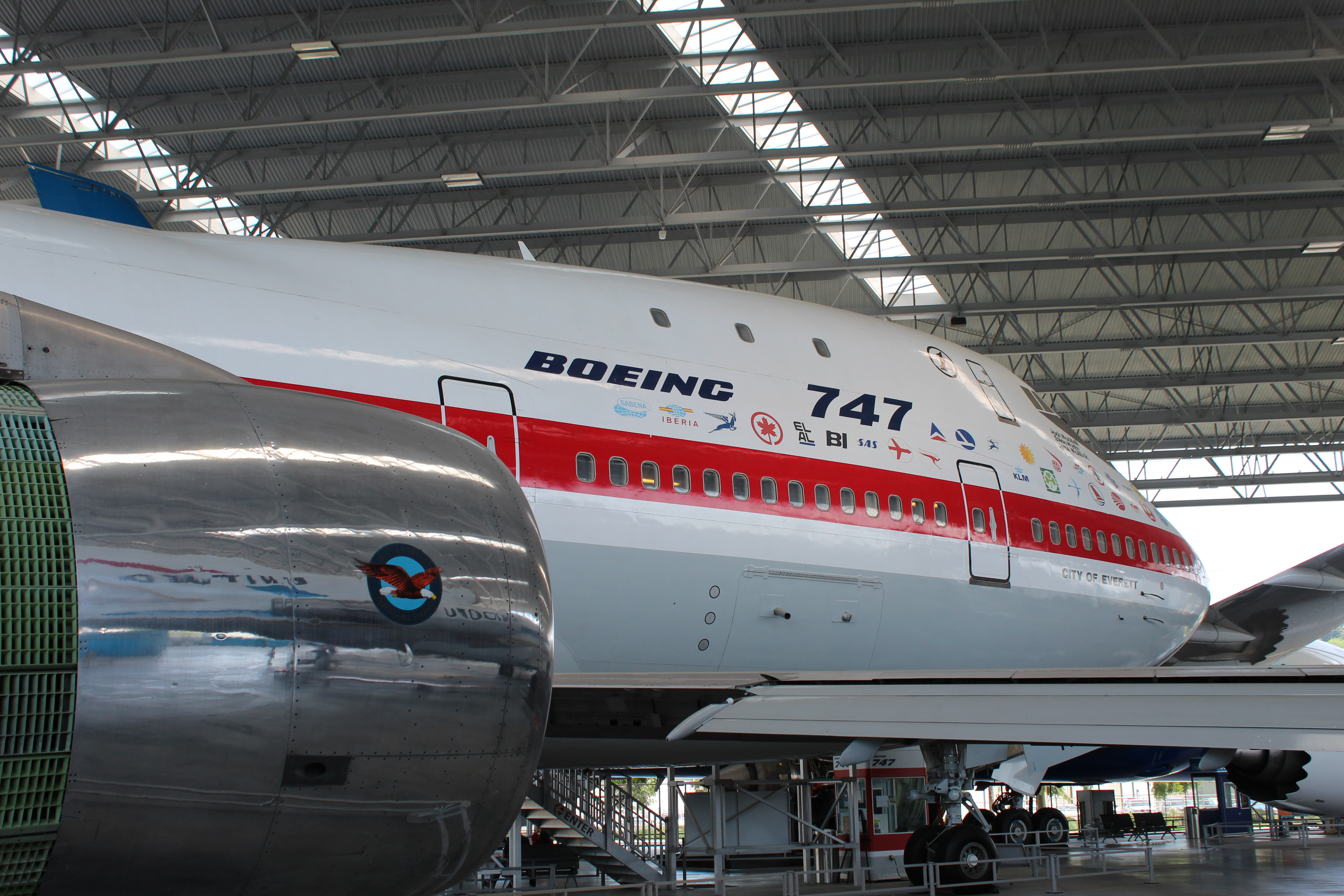
N7470 displayed at the covered pavilion at the Museum of Flight after restoration.

On April 6, 1995, N7470 embarked on its last-ever flight. The aircraft, still in its test-configured state, was donated to the Museum of Flight located at Boeing Field in Seattle, Washington where it was placed on static display.

By the early 2000s, the aircraft was in need of restoration due to its advanced age and prolonged exposure to the wet weather of the Pacific Northwest.

The board of the Museum of Flight authorized the restoration in the summer of 2012 and embarked on a nearly two-year-long effort. The aircraft was restored in place, not moved into a hangar, which complicated the effort. On the aircraft's exterior, the faded paint was sanded down, and crews applied more than 60 gallons of fresh paint. The interior, damaged with mildew, was restored to the aircraft's first-flight configuration, with testing equipment on the main deck, and period-appropriate upholstery was located to recreate the upper deck lounge's furniture. The aircraft reopened for public tours in 2014. After the restoration, a large roof was built over the Museum's Aviation Pavilion to better protect N7470 and other aircraft on display.

== List of airline logos on this aircraft ==
These are all listed in alphabetical order:

- American Airlines (AA)
- Air Canada (AC)
- Air France (AF)
- Air India (AI)
- Alitalia (AZA)
- Aer Lingus (AL)
- Braniff International Airways (BIA)
- British Overseas Airways Corporation (BOAC)
- Continental Airlines (CA)
- Delta Air Lines (DAL)
- Eastern Air Lines (EAL)
- El Al Israel Airlines Ltd. (El Al)
- Iberia (airline) (IBE)
- Japan Air Lines (JAL)
- KLM Royal Dutch Airlines (KLM)
- Lufthansa (DLH)
- National Airlines (NA)
- Northwest Orient Airlines (NOA)
- Pan American World Airways (Pan Am)
- Qantas (QFA)
- Sabena (SAB)
- Scandinavian Airlines System (SAS)
- South African Airways (SAA)
- Swissair (SWR)
- Trans World Airlines (TWA)
- United Airlines (UA)
- World Airways (WA)

== See also ==
- List of preserved Boeing aircraft
