= B-HNL =

Boeing 777 prototype

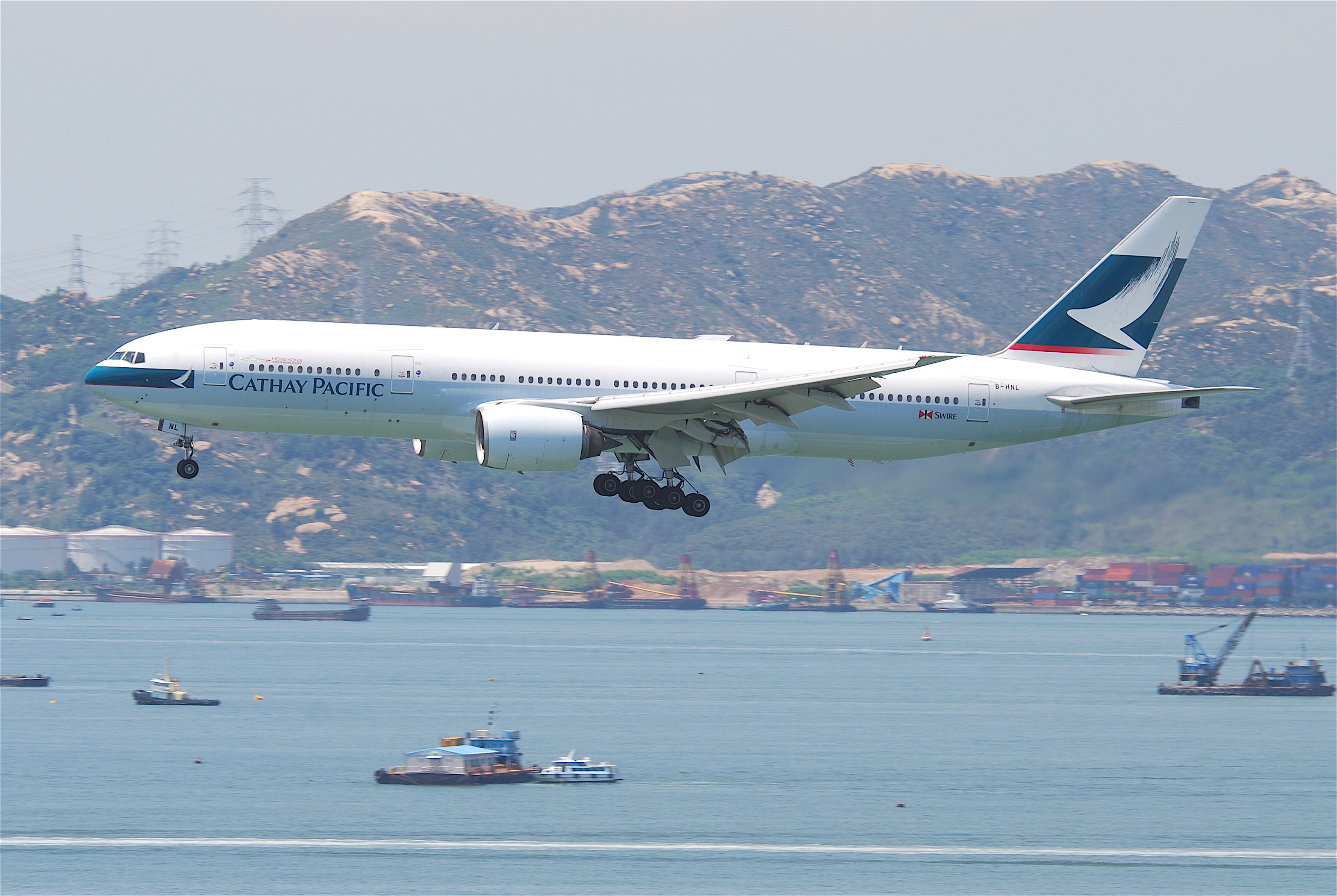
- B-HNL approaching Hong Kong International Airport on 4 August 2011

General information
- Type: Boeing 777-200 (Note: This aircraft was built as a prototype for Boeing; 00 is the Boeing customer code for Boeing's internal-use aircraft.)
- Role: airliner
- Manufacturer: Boeing
- Registration: B-HNL; N7771 (former)
- Flights: 20,519
- Total hours: 49,687

History
- Manufactured: 9 April 1994
- First flight: 12 June 1994
- In service: 1994–2018
- Last flight: 18 September 2018
- Preserved at: Pima Air & Space Museum in Tucson, Arizona, United States
- Fate: On display

B-HNL is a Boeing 777-200 aircraft that was built by Boeing Commercial Airplanes as the prototype of the 777. It rolled off the assembly line, originally registered as N7771, on 9 April 1994 and first flew on 12 June. It then spent 11 months in flight testing and certification and on 19 April 1995, the aircraft type was certified by the Federal Aviation Administration (FAA) and the European Joint Aviation Authorities (JAA) with United Airlines being its launch customer. After six years in Boeing's test fleet, it was briefly placed in storage, but then refurbished for sale to Cathay Pacific and re-registered as B-HNL. It was retired 18 years later, performing its final flight on 18 September 2018 to the Pima Air & Space Museum where it was placed on static display.

== Aircraft development ==
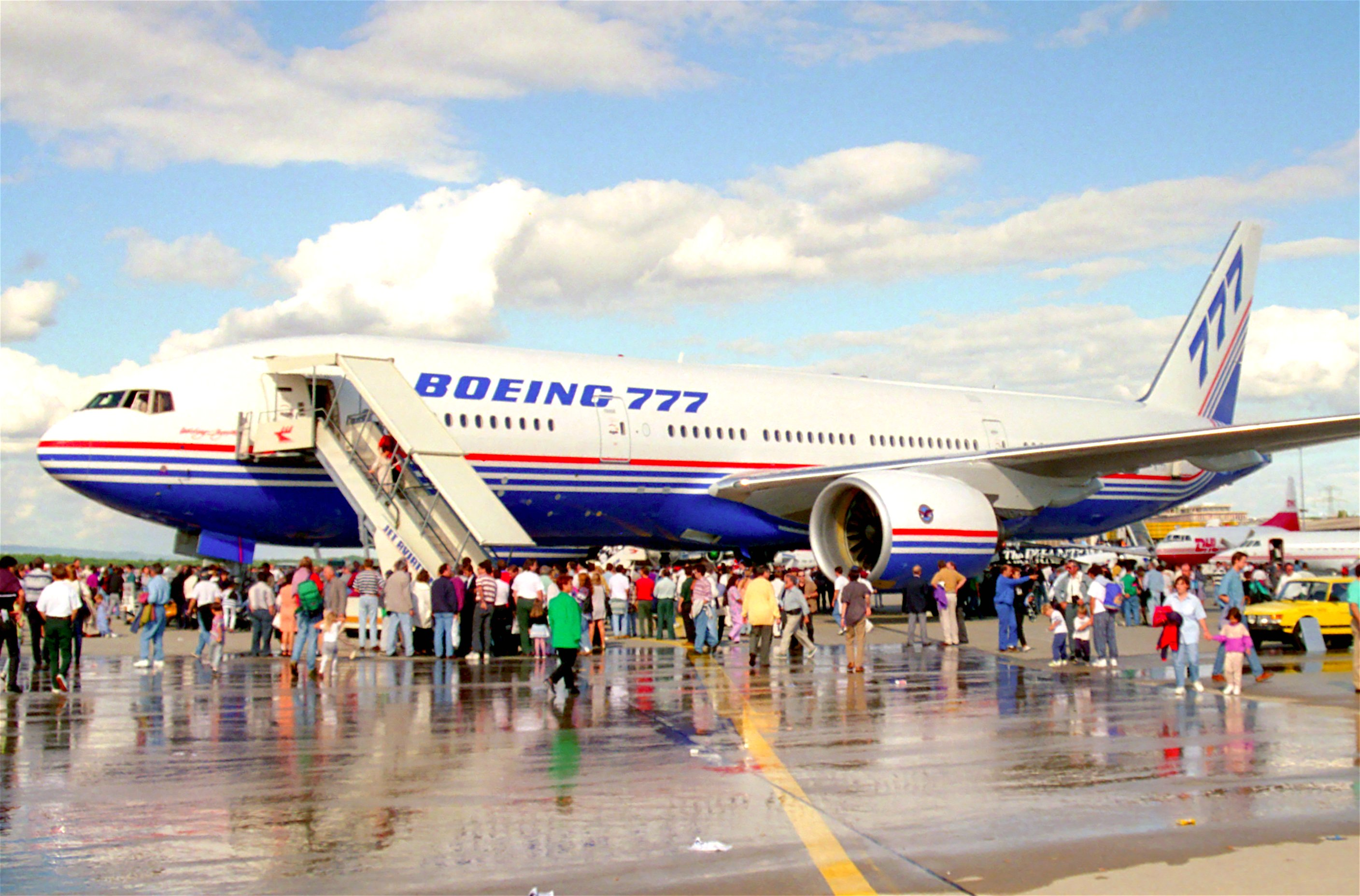
B-HNL, originally registered as N7771, at Geneva Airport on 9 September 1995

The Boeing 777 is the world's largest twin-engine jet and the first of two Boeing aircraft to feature fly-by-wire flight controls, followed by the Boeing 787 Dreamliner.

In early 1990, Boeing and eight major airlines — All Nippon Airways, American Airlines, British Airways, Cathay Pacific, Delta Air Lines, Japan Airlines, Qantas (Note: Qantas did not order the 777, instead favouring the Airbus A330 and additional Boeing 747s. While the Boeing 777X was considered as a possible candidate for the airline's Project Sunrise, the airline placed an order for the Airbus A350 instead), and United Airlines— came together and worked on a new aircraft design. The aircraft, which became the Boeing 777, filled a crucial size and range gap in Boeing's commercial airliner lineup, offering greater passenger capacity than the twin-engine Boeing 767 and improved operating efficiency compared to the quad-engine wide-body Boeing 747. In October 1990, United Airlines placed the first order for the 777— a total of 34 firm orders and 34 options valued at approximately $11 billion (~$23.9 billion in 2025), marking the largest commercial aircraft order at the time.

== History ==
=== Roll out ===
On 9 April 1994, B-HNL, originally registered as N7771 and with the manufacturer's number WA001, rolled off the assembly line at the Boeing Everett Factory, an airplane factory that was originally constructed to build the massive Boeing 747. The aircraft was originally powered by two Pratt & Whitney PW4074 engines with each delivering about 77,000 lbf (340 kN) pounds of thrust. The aircraft was assigned the serial number 27116.

=== First flight & certification ===
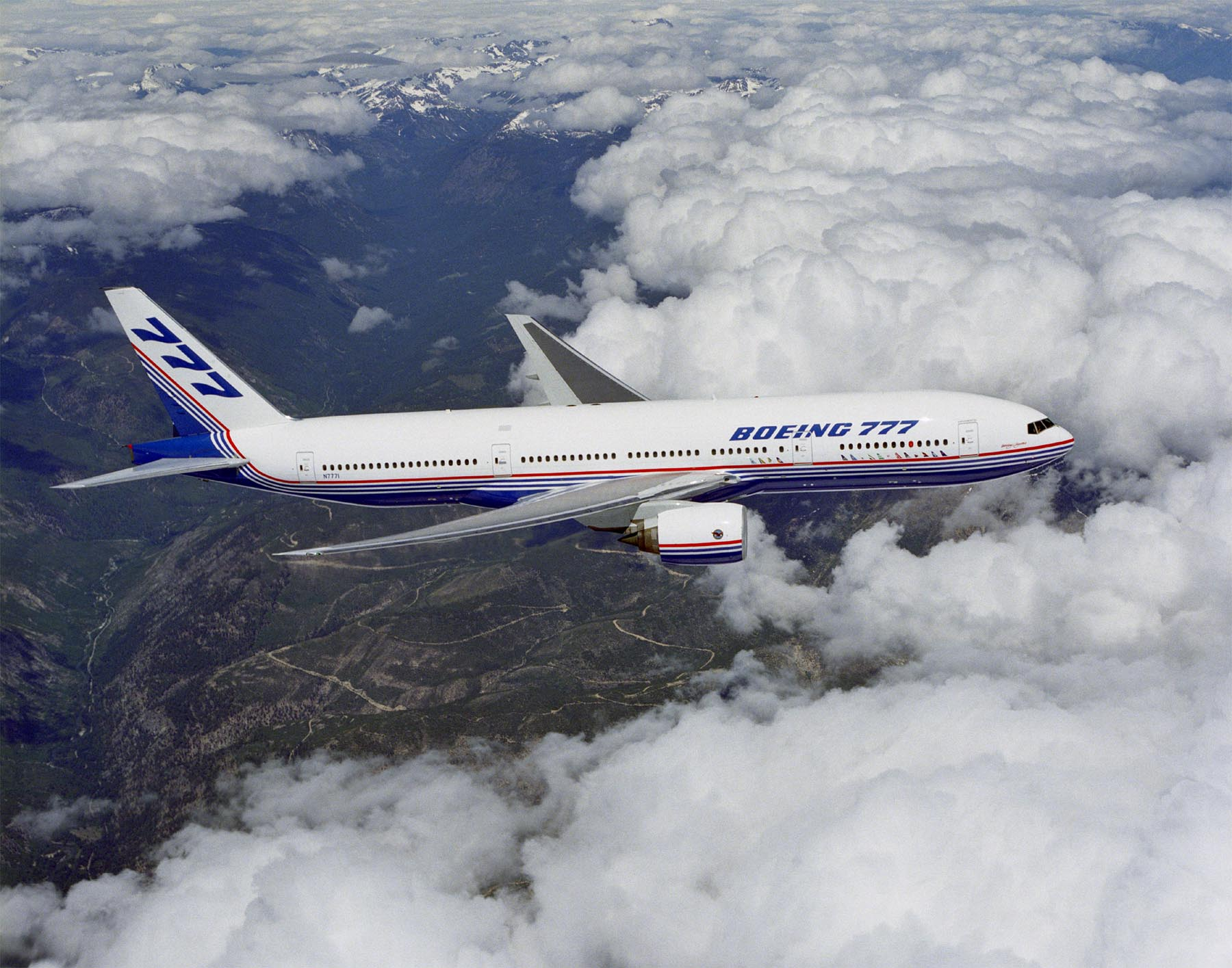
N7771 flying over clouds

On 12 June 1994, before the first flight, Philip M. Condit, then-Boeing's president, wished John Cashman, test pilot, good luck and jokingly added, "And no rolls!" This reference alluded to the noteworthy occasion when Alvin M. Johnston famously performed a successful barrel roll in the Dash 80 jet demonstrator on 6 August 1955. At approximately 11:45 a.m. PT, N7771 took to the skies with the flight lasting about 3 hours and 48 minutes, setting a record as the lengthiest first flight for any of Boeing's airliners. During the flight, it reached a peak altitude of 19,000 feet (5,791 meters) and successfully completed all scheduled tests, including the in-flight shutdown and restart of an engine. On 19 April 1995, the aircraft type was certified by the Federal Aviation Administration (FAA) and the European Joint Aviation Authorities (JAA). On 30 May, the FAA granted 180 minutes ETOPS clearance for PW4074-powered 777-200s.

=== Commercial service entry ===
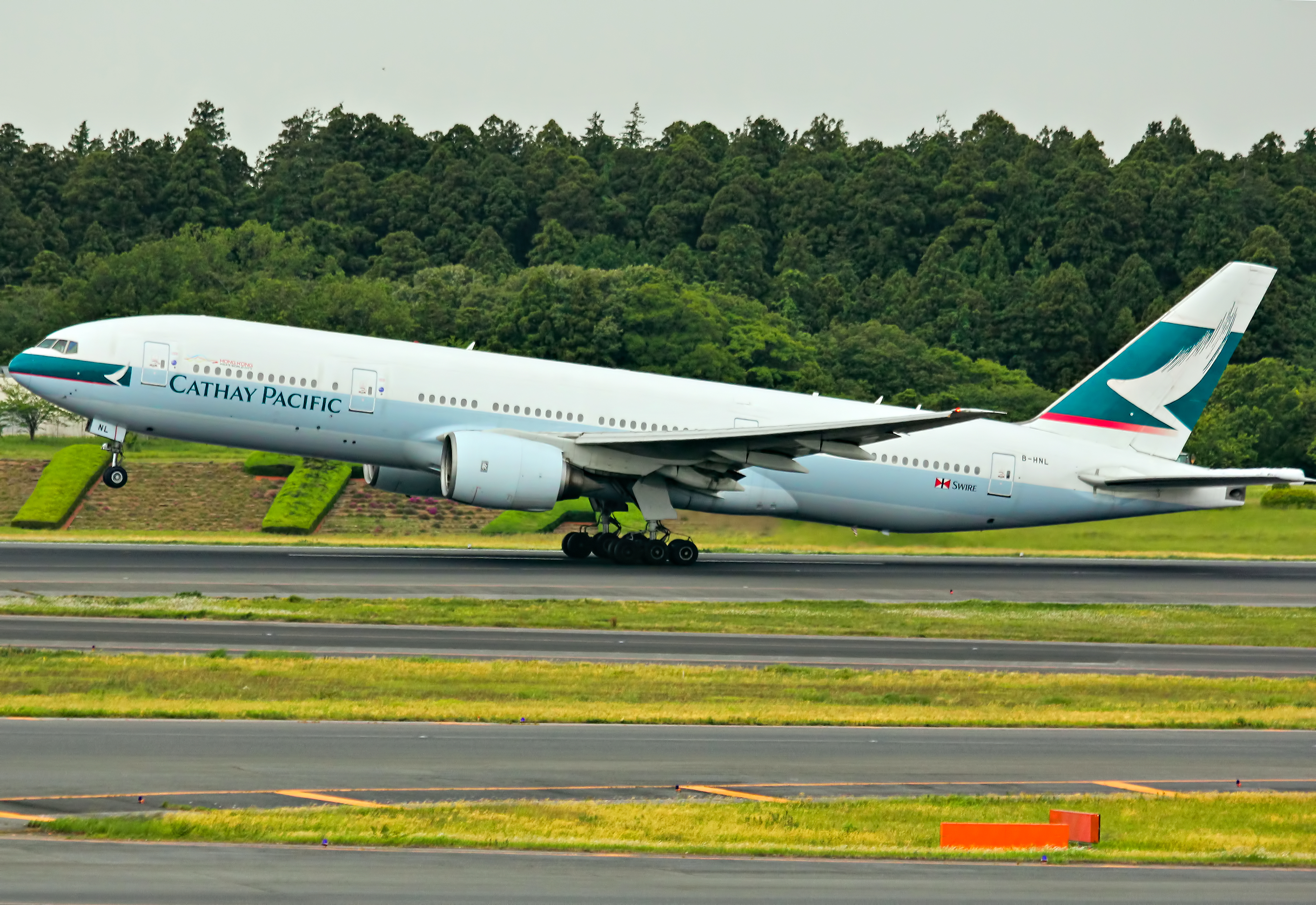
B-HNL seen here on 28 May 2013

By 2000, Boeing was no longer using N7771 for flight testing and development, and the aircraft was stored near a production facility without engines. Cathay Pacific, finding itself needing an additional aircraft to meet expected demand, inquired about the possibility of refurbishing and purchasing N7771; at the time, no delivery slots were available for newly-built 777s due to high customer demand. As part of the refurbishment process, Boeing installed Rolls-Royce Trent 884B-17 engines, as used on the rest of the airline's 777 fleet; this necessitated the replacement of the engine pylons (being the only 777 to switch from PW4000 to RR Trent 800). On 6 December 2000, after being repainted and re-registered, B-HNL was delivered to Cathay Pacific.

=== Retirement ===
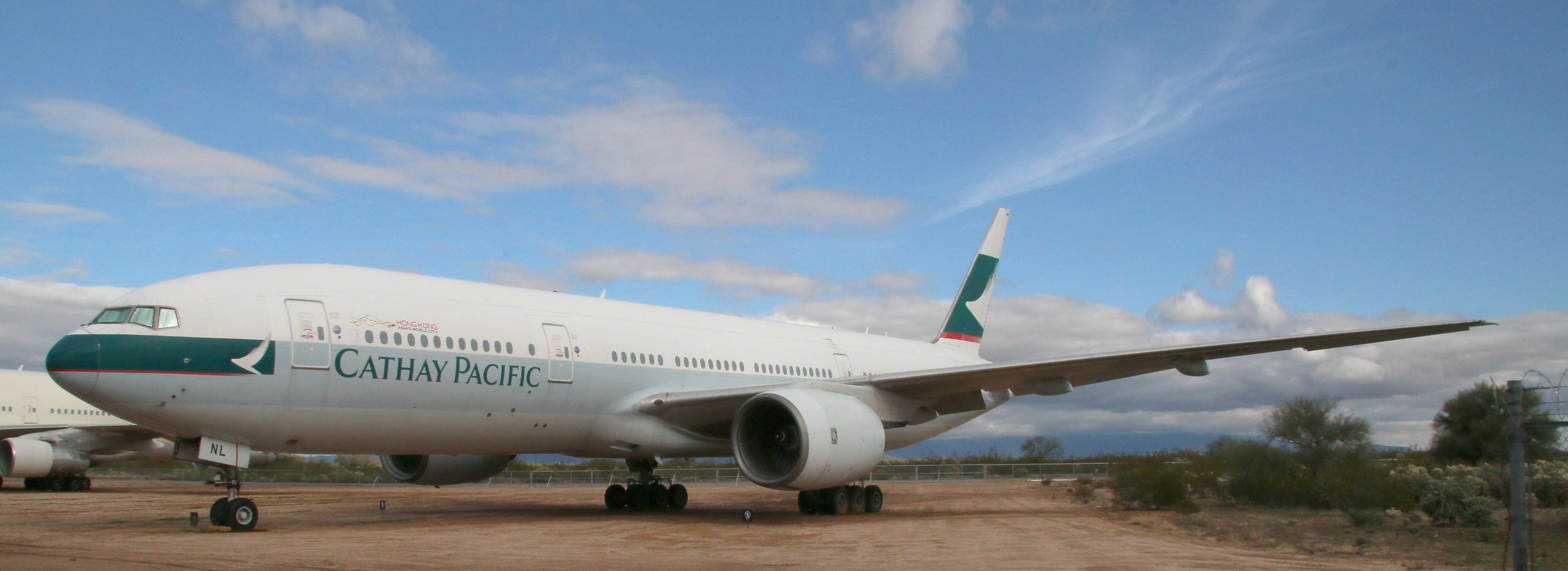
B-HNL on display at the Pima Air & Space Museum

After almost 18 years of service, Cathay Pacific retired B-HNL on 1 June 2018. A day prior, B-HNL took its last commercial flight from Osaka, Japan, to Hong Kong as CX507. Cathay Pacific and Boeing both chose the Pima Air & Space Museum to display B-HNL and on 18 September 2018, it performed its final 14-hour flight from China, with a refueling stop in Hong Kong, to Tucson, Arizona.
