= List of NASA aircraft =

Throughout its history NASA has used several different types of aircraft on a permanent, semi-permanent, or short-term basis. These aircraft are usually surplus, but in a few cases are newly built, military aircraft.

== Current aircraft ==
Aircraft	Number in service	Introduced	Research Center
Aero Spacelines Super Guppy	1		Johnson Space Center
Aeromot TG-14	1		Armstrong Flight Research Center
Airbus H135	3		Kennedy Space Center
Beechcraft T-34 Mentor	3		Armstrong Flight Research Center (1), Glenn Research Center (2)
Beechcraft B-200	3		Armstrong Flight Research Center (1), Langley Research Center (2)
Cirrus SR22	1		Langley Research Center
Columbia LC-40	1		Langley Research Center
DHC-6 Twin Otter	1		Glenn Research Center
Dassault Falcon HU-25 Guardian	1		Langley Research Center
Gulfstream C-20A	1	2008	Armstrong Flight Research Center
Gulfstream III	4	2012	Armstrong Flight Research Center (2), Langley Research Center (1), Johnson Space Center (1)
Gulfstream V	1	2012	Johnson Space Center
Lockheed C-130 Hercules	1		Wallops Flight Facility
Lockheed P-3 Orion	1	1991	Wallops Flight Facility
Lockheed ER-2	2	1981	Armstrong Flight Research Center
Martin WB-57 Canberra	3		Johnson Space Center
McDonnell Douglas F-15 Eagle	3		Armstrong Flight Research Center
McDonnell Douglas F/A-18 Hornet	3		Armstrong Flight Research Center
Northrop T-38 Talon	20		Johnson Space Center

== Aircraft ==
Aircraft	Type	Use	Status (Qty)	Dates From To	Research Centers	Current Location	Comments
Aero Spacelines Super Guppy	Fixed Wing	Heavy transport aircraft	Active (1)		N/A	El Paso Forward Operating Location	
Aerojet General X-8	Rocket	Research, X-Planes, Upper air research and sounding	Retired		Armstrong Flight Research Center		
AeroVironment Centurion	Fixed Wing, UAV	Research, Environmental Research Aircraft and Sensor Technology (ERAST)	Retired (1)		Ames Research Center, Armstrong Flight Research Center		Centurion was an evolutionary solar and fuel cell system powered unmanned aircraft.
AeroVironment Gossamer Albatross	Fixed Wing	Research, Human Powered	Retired (1)			Smithsonian National Air and Space Museum	
AeroVironment Helios	Fixed Wing, UAV	Research, Environmental Research Aircraft and Sensor Technology (ERAST)	Retired (1)		Ames Research Center, Armstrong Flight Research Center		NASA's Helios Prototype was an evolutionary solar and fuel cell system powered unmanned aircraft.
AeroVironment Pathfinder	Fixed Wing, UAV	Research, Environmental Research Aircraft and Sensor Technology (ERAST)	Retired (1)		Ames Research Center, Armstrong Flight Research Center		AeroVironment Pathfinder Prototype was an evolutionary solar and fuel cell system powered unmanned aircraft.
AeroVironment Pathfinder Plus	Fixed Wing, UAV	Research, Environmental Research Aircraft and Sensor Technology (ERAST)	Retired (1)		Ames Research Center, Armstrong Flight Research Center	Smithsonian National Air and Space Museum	Pathfinder Plus Prototype was an evolutionary solar and fuel cell system powered unmanned aircraft.
AeroVironment RQ-14 Dragon Eye	Fixed Wing, UAV	Research Platform, Airborne Science Program	Active (1)		Ames Research Center	Ames Research Center	
Eurocopter EC135	Rotorcraft		Active (3)	Delivery of the first two on September 30, 2020, the third on March 11, 2021.	Kennedy Space Center	Kennedy Space Center	
Beechcraft Super King Air (NASA 8)	Fixed Wing	Transport Personnel	Active (1)		Wallops Flight Facility	Wallops Flight Facility	Carries employees from Wallops Flight Facility, Virginia and Baltimore
Beechcraft King Air B-200 (UC-12B)	Fixed Wing	Research Platform, Airborne Science Program	Active (2)		Armstrong Flight Research Center, Langley Research Center	Armstrong Flight Research Center, Langley Research Center	
Beechcraft T-34C	Fixed Wing	Research Platform & Photographic Chase	Active (2)		Glenn Research Center, Armstrong Flight Research Center	Wallops Flight Facility, Armstrong Flight Research Center	
Bell UH-1H Iroquois (Huey)	Rotorcraft		Retired		Wallops Flight Facility	Wallops Flight Facility	
Bell Lunar Landing Research Vehicle LLRV			Retired		Armstrong Flight Research Center	Armstrong Flight Research Center (#2)	
Bell X-1A Glamorous Glennis		Research, X-Planes,	Retired	1946	Armstrong Flight Research Center	National Air and Space Museum	High-speed and high-altitude testing. First aircraft to break the sound barrier in level flight.Proved aerodynamic viability of thin wing sections.
Bell X-1B		Research, X-Planes,	Retired		Armstrong Flight Research Center	National Museum of the United States Air Force	
Bell X-1E		Research, X-Planes,	Retired		Armstrong Flight Research Center	Armstrong Flight Research Center	
Bell X-5		Research, X-Planes,	Retired	1951	Armstrong Flight Research Center	National Museum of the United States Air Force	First aircraft to fly with variable geometry wings.
Bell XV-15	V/STOL, Tilt Rotor	Research,	Retired (1)		Ames Research Center	Steven F. Udvar-Hazy Center	
Bellanca Skyrocket II	Fixed Wing	Civil Aircraft Test	Retired (1)		Langley Research Center		
Boeing 737, NASA 515	Fixed Wing	Research, Terminal Area Productivity (TAP)	Retired (1)	1974-2003	Langley Research Center	Museum of Flight	NASA 515 is the first Boeing 737 ever built. After being used to qualify the 737 design, NASA heavily modified the aircraft for continuing research.
Boeing 747-100SR	Fixed Wing	Shuttle Carrier Aircraft	Retired (2)	1977–2012	Armstrong Flight Research Center	Armstrong Flight Research Center	Registered as N905NA (which is a 747-100 model that was acquired from American Airlines in 1974) and N911NA (a 747-100SR model purchased from Japan Airlines in 1988). In 2013, Space Center Houston announced plans to display SCA 905 with the mockup shuttle Independence mounted on its back. NASA 905 was erected on site at the space center, having been ferried in pieces from Ellington Field, and the replica shuttle was mounted in August 2014. The display opened in early 2016. N911NA is currently on display at the Joe Davies Heritage Airpark at Palmdale Plant 42.
Boeing 747, (SOFIA)	Fixed Wing	Airborne observatory, Stratospheric Observatory for Infrared Astronomy (SOFIA)	Retired (1)	1997–2022	Ames Research Center, Armstrong Flight Research Center	Armstrong Flight Research Center	Retired 2022
Boeing 757	Fixed Wing	Research Platform, Advanced technology	Retired (1)				Ex–Eastern 757
Boeing B-52B	Fixed Wing	Research, Test Platform	Retired (2)	1959-2004	Ames Research Center, Armstrong Flight Research Center	Pima Air & Space Museum (003), Air Force Flight Test Center Museum (008)	Balls 8 (NB-52B) was used as a mothership for the X-15 program, 127 Lifting body flight tests such as the HL-10 test flight, to support development in the Space Shuttle program, and several other miscellaneous test programs. After almost 50 years flying service Balls 8 was retired from active service with NASA on December 17, 2004, following its participation in the Hyper-X program.
Boeing CH-47B Chinook	Rotorcraft	Research, Variable Stability Research Rotorcraft project	Retired (2)		Ames Research Center, Langley Research Center		It was equipped to fly by wire and had three on-board computers. After research was completed, it was returned to the US Army and upgraded to the CH–47D standard.
Boeing KC-135 Stratotanker	Fixed Wing	Trainer, Reduced gravity aircraft	Retired (2)	1973 - 2004	Ellington Field, Houston, Texas	Ellington Field, Houston, Texas	USAF KC–135As (designated N930NA and N931NA) Potential astronauts were exposed to simulated near–weightlessness. These aircraft are also known as Vomit Comets.
Boeing X-37		Research, X-Planes,	Active	2006 (drop test), 2010 (orbital flight)	Armstrong Flight Research Center		Reusable orbital spaceplane.
Boeing X-40		Research, X-Planes,	Retired	1998	Armstrong Flight Research Center		80% scale Space Maneuver Vehicle testbed.X-37 prototype.
Boeing X-48	Fixed Wing, UAV	Research, X-Planes, Environmentally Responsible Aviation Project	Retired (1)		Armstrong Flight Research Center		X-48 series was utilized to "evaluate the low-speed stability and control of a low-noise version of a notional hybrid-wing-body design." NASA is hoping that this particular aircraft will aid in the design "green airlines." Blended Wing Body (BWB) testbed.
Boeing X-45A	Fixed Wing, UAV	Research, X-Planes,	Retired		Armstrong Flight Research Center	National Air and Space Museum (#1 Blue), National Museum of the United States Air Force (#2 Red)	
Boeing X-53 Active Aeroelastic Wing		Research, X-Planes,	Retired	2002	Armstrong Flight Research Center		Active Aeroelastic Wing testbed.
Boeing Vertol VZ-2 (Model 76)	V/STOL, Tilt Rotor	Research,	Retired (1)		Ames Research Center, Armstrong Flight Research Center	Smithsonian National Air and Space Museum Paul E. Garber Facility.	Built in the United States in 1957 to investigate the tiltwing approach to vertical take-off and landing.
Cessna 206H	Fixed Wing	Research Platform, Airborne Science Program	Retired (1)	2001-2024	Langley Research Center	Langley Research Center	
Cessna 337 Skymaster	Fixed Wing	Civil Aircraft Test, Small Aircraft Transportation System	Retired (1)		Langley Research Center		
Cessna 318 T-37 Tweet	Fixed Wing	Civil Aircraft Test, Small Aircraft Transportation System	Retired (1)		Langley Research Center		
Cirrus SR22	Fixed Wing	Civil Aircraft Test, Small Aircraft Transportation System	Retired (1)		Langley Research Center		
Convair 880	Fixed Wing	Research, Controlled Impact Demonstration Program	Retired (1)		Ames Research Center, Langley Research Center, Armstrong Flight Research Center		
Convair 990 (Galileo)	Fixed Wing	Airborne observatory, Galileo Observatory	Destroyed (1), Retired (1) & Crashed (1)		Ames Research Center, Armstrong Flight Research Center	Mojave Air and Space Port	The Galileo I aircraft was lost in a mid-air collision in 1973 with a P-3. The Galileo II continued service into the 1980s providing research into aeronautics, astronautics, astronomy, and earth observations, but was destroyed in 1985 by fire after the right main landing gear failed and punctured fuel tanks. NASA 810 was used to test the shuttle landing gear and braking systems, before being retired.
Convair F-106 Delta Dart (QF–106A)	Fixed Wing		Retired	1986 - 1998		Langley Research Center	
Convair C-131 Samaritan (Convair CV-240)	Fixed Wing	Training, Reduced gravity aircraft, Landsat Earth Resources Survey program (ERS)	Retired (2)		Langley Research Center, Ellington Field, Houston, TX		Project Mercury astronauts flew aboard a C-131 Samaritan flying as the "vomit comet
Dassault HU-25C Falcon	Fixed Wing	Research Platform, Airborne Science Program	Active (1)		Langley Research Center	Langley Research Center	
de Havilland Canada DHC-5 Buffalo (Bisontennial) named in 1976	Fixed Wing	Research, STOL	Retired (1)	1970s late - early 1980s	Ames Research Center		Fitted with a short-span Boeing wing incorporating split-flow turbofan engines based on the Rolls-Royce Spey (providing both propulsion and augmentor airflow for the powered lift system). Beginning in 1972 with its first flight in this experimental configuration, this aircraft was used jointly by the NASA Ames Research Center and the Canadian Department of Industry, Trade and Commerce for STOL research.
de Havilland Canada DHC-5 Buffalo (QSRA)	Fixed Wing	Research, STOL, Quiet Short-Haul Research Aircraft program.	Retired (1)	1970s late - early 1980s	Ames Research Center, Armstrong Flight Research Center		The experimental wing was designed, fabricated and installed by Boeing was a swept, supercritical design incorporating a boundary layer control system. Instead of the standard engines, this aircraft was powered by four prototype Avco Lycoming YF102 high-bypass turbofan engines (originally from the Northrop YA-9 program) mounted above the wing to take advantage of the Coandă effect. In 1980, this aircraft participated in carrier trials aboard USS Kitty Hawk, demonstrating STOL performance without the use of catapults or arrestor gear.
de Havilland Canada DHC-6 Twin Otter (N607NA)	Fixed Wing	Research, aircraft icing	Retired (1)		Glenn Research Center	Middle Tennessee State University at Murfreesboro Municipal Airport	
Doak VZ-4	VTOL	Research	Retired (1)		Langley Research Center	U.S. Army Transportation Museum	
Douglas C-47 Skytrain	Fixed Wing	Test	Retired		Ames Research Center		
Douglas C-118 Liftmaster	Fixed Wing				Wallops Flight Facility		
Douglas C-133 Cargomaster	Fixed Wing	Heavy Transport Aircraft	Retired	1966–1969			
Douglas D-558-1 Skystreak			Retired		Armstrong Flight Research Center	National Museum of Naval Aviation (#1), Carolinas Aviation Museum (#3)	
Douglas D-558-2 Skyrocket			Retired		Armstrong Flight Research Center	Planes of Fame Museum (#1), National Air and Space Museum (#2), Antelope Valley College (#3)	
Douglas F5D Skylancer	Fixed Wing	Trainer, Chase Plane	Retired (2)	1961 - 1970	Armstrong Flight Research Center	Neil Armstrong Air and Space Museum (802), Ontario Municipal Airport (708)	Used as a testbed for supersonic research and to train pilots for the X-20 Dyna-Soar program. The F5D-1 Skylancer had a wing planform similar to the proposed design for Dyna-Soar. After the Dyna-Soar program was canceled in December 1963, one F5D-1 stayed on at Armstrong, eventually becoming a flight simulator for the M2-F2, and a chase plane for experimental flights until 1970. In May 1970 one of the aircraft was retired and donated to the Neil Armstrong Air and Space Museum.
Douglas X-3 Stiletto	Fixed Wing	Research, X-Planes	Retired (1)	1952–1956	Armstrong Flight Research Center	National Museum of the United States Air Force	Titanium alloy construction; low aspect ratio wings. Planned to test long-duration high-speed flight. Incapable of reaching design speed, but provided insights into inertia coupling.
Dyke Delta	Fixed Wing						
Eiri-Avion PIK-20	Fixed Wing, Sailplane	Research, Lift & Aerodynamics	Retired (1)	1981–1996	Armstrong Flight Research Center		
General Atomics ALTUS	Fixed Wing, UAV	Research, Environmental Research Aircraft and Sensor Technology (ERAST)	Retired? (2)		Armstrong Flight Research Center		
General Atomics MQ-9 Reaper (Predator-B IKHANA)	Fixed Wing, UAV	Research Platform	Active (1)		Armstrong Flight Research Center	Armstrong Flight Research Center	
General Dynamics F-16 Fighting Falcon	Fixed Wing	Research,	Retired (2)	1988 - 1999	Armstrong Flight Research Center		Prototypes of the F-16XL, designed as a competitor to the F-15E Strike Eagle in the USAF's Enhanced Tactical Fighter program
General Dynamics F-16 VISTA	Fixed Wing	Research, Variability in flight simulator aircraft	Retired (1)		Langley Research Center		Now in use by the USAF Test PIlot School under the designation X-62.
General Dynamics F-16XL	Fixed Wing	Research,	Retired (2)		Armstrong Flight Research Center, Langley Research Center	Armstrong Flight Research Center (1)	
Grumman Gulfstream I	Fixed Wing		Retired (7)			Johnson Space Center	
Grumman X-29	Fixed Wing	Research, X-Planes, Forward swept wing	Retired (2)	1984–1991	Armstrong Flight Research Center	National Museum of the United States Air Force	
Grumman Gulfstream II	Fixed Wing	Shuttle Training Aircraft (STA)	Active (4)		NA	El Paso Forward Operating Location, Ellington Field, Houston, Texas (NASA C-11A)	
Gulfstream G-III	Fixed Wing	Research Platform, Research Platform, Airborne Science Program, Unmanned Air Vehicle Synthetic Aperture Radar (UAVSAR)	Active (1)	2003 - Today	Jet Propulsion Laboratory, Armstrong Flight Research Center	Armstrong Flight Research Center (NASA C–20A)	Acquired from the United States Air Force and modified by Armstrong Flight Research Center. The aircraft was equipped with a self-contained on-board Data Collection and Processing System (DCAPS), which allows for automated configuration setups thereby reducing engineering costs for each flight. The aircraft has been used by the Uninhabited Aerial Vehicle Synthetic Aperture Radar (UAVSAR) program, the Access 5 program alongside Scaled Composites Proteus aircraft, and as a test bed to develop collision avoidance systems and procedures.
Gulfstream G-III, NASA one	Fixed Wing	Business jet of the NASA Administrator	Active (1)	2003 - 2008	NA		NASA one was a Gulfstream G-III with a seating capacity of 12 people. The jet is stored in an FAA hangar along with 3 other government planes. NASA now shares a plane with FAA.
Gulfstream X-54		Research, X-Planes,	Proposed			Armstrong Flight Research Center	
Hawker Siddeley P.1127	V/STOL		Retired		Langley Research Center		
Kreider-Reisner XC-31	Fixed Wing	Research, DeIcing	Retired (1)		Langley Research Center		
Learjet 23	Fixed Wing	Business jet	?				
Learjet 24	Fixed Wing	Business jet			Ames Research Center, Armstrong Flight Research Center		Lear Jet Airborne Observatory
Learjet 25	Fixed Wing	Business jet	Active		Wallops Flight Facility	Wallops Flight Facility	
Learjet 28	Fixed Wing	Business jet					
Ling-Temco-Vought LTV XC-142	V/STOL, Tilt Wing	Research, Transport aircraft	Retired (1)	1966–1970	Langley Research Center		
Lockheed C-5 Galaxy	Fixed Wing	Heavy transport aircraft	Active (2)				Flown by USAF crews.
Lockheed C-121 Starliner	Fixed Wing		Retired				
Lockheed C-141A Starlifter	Fixed Wing	Airborne observatory, Kuiper Airborne Observatory	Retired (1)	1974 - 1995	Ames Research Center		
Lockheed F-104A Starfighter			Retired		Armstrong Flight Research Center	National Air and Space Museum (818) (N818NA), Air Force Flight Test Center Museum (N820NA) (0790)	
Lockheed F-104B Starfighter			Retired		Armstrong Flight Research Center	McClellan AFB (N819NA)	
Lockheed F-104G Starfighter			Retired		Armstrong Flight Research Center	Estrella Warbird Museum (N824NA), Armstrong Flight Research Center (N826NA)	
Lockheed F-104N Starfighter	Fixed Wing	Chase	Retired (6) & Crashed (1)	1963 - 1995	Armstrong Flight Research Center	Embry-Riddle Aeronautical University (N811NA) (4045), Lockheed Martin, Palmdale, CA (N812NA)	One of these aircraft, piloted by Joe Walker, collided with the XB-70 Valkyrie experimental bomber on June 8, 1966, killing Walker.
Lockheed JetStar	Fixed Wing	Research Platform	Retired (1)	1964-1989	Armstrong Flight Research Center		
Lockheed NC-130B Hercules	Fixed Wing	Research Platform, Landsat Earth Resources Survey program (ERS)	Active (1)		Wallops Flight Facility	Wallops Flight Facility	
Lockheed P-3 Orion	Fixed Wing	Research Platform, Airborne Science Program	Active (1)		Wallops Flight Facility	Wallops Flight Facility	
Lockheed S-3 Viking	Fixed Wing	Research Platform	Retired		Glenn Research Center		
Lockheed SR-71	Fixed Wing	Trainer	Retired (1)	1991 - 1999	Armstrong Flight Research Center	Pima Air Museum	The plane was permanently retired in 1998, and the Air Force quickly disposed of their SR-71s, leaving NASA with the last two airworthy Blackbirds until 1999. All other Blackbirds have been moved to museums except for the two SR-71s and a few D-21 drones retained by the NASA Dryden Research Center.
Lockheed SR-71A Blackbird	Fixed Wing	Trainer	Retired (1)	1991 - 1999	Armstrong Flight Research Center	Armstrong Flight Research Center	The plane was permanently retired in 1998, and the Air Force quickly disposed of their SR-71s, leaving NASA with the last two airworthy Blackbirds until 1999. All other Blackbirds have been moved to museums except for the two SR-71s and a few D-21 drones retained by the NASA Armstrong Flight Research Center.
Lockheed SR-71B Blackbird	Fixed Wing	Trainer	Retired (1)	1991 - 1999	Armstrong Flight Research Center	Kalamazoo Aviation History Museum	The plane was permanently retired in 1998, and the Air Force quickly disposed of their SR-71s, leaving NASA with the last two airworthy Blackbirds until 1999. All other Blackbirds have been moved to museums except for the two SR-71s and a few D-21 drones retained by the NASA Armstrong Flight Research Center.
Lockheed U-2 "Dragon Lady"	Fixed Wing	Research Platform, Airborne Science Program, Landsat Earth Resources Survey program (ERS), High Altitude	Active (2)		Armstrong Flight Research Center		Modified to the ER-2 (Earth Resources-2) standard
Lockheed YF-12	Fixed Wing	Research,	Retired (1)		Armstrong Flight Research Center, Langley Research Center, Glenn Research Center	National Museum of the United States Air Force	
Lockheed YO-3 Quiet Star	Fixed Wing	Research	Retired (1)		Armstrong Flight Research Center		
X-33 Venture Star		Research, X-Planes,	Retired (1)	Prototype never completed	Lockheed Martin		Half-scale reusable launch vehicle prototype.
Lockheed Martin X-44 MANTA		Research, X-Planes,	Retired	Cancelled	Armstrong Flight Research Center		F-22-based Multi-Axis No-Tail Aircraft thrust vectoring testbed.
Lockheed Martin X-56 (MUTT)	Fixed Wing, UAV	Research Platform, X-Planes, Multi-Utility Technology Testbed	Retired (1)	2012	Armstrong Flight Research Center		Active flutter suppression and gust load alleviation technology for potential use in future high-altitude, long-endurance (HALE) reconnaissance aircraft.
Lockheed Martin X-59 QueSST		Research, X-Planes	In Development (1)	2022	Armstrong Flight Research Center		Low boom quiet super sonic demonstrator.
Martin WB-57 Canberra	Fixed Wing	Research Platform - Airborne Science Program, Landsat Earth Resources Survey program (ERS) High Altitude	Active (3)		Lyndon B. Johnson Space Center	Lyndon B. Johnson Space Center	Earth Resources Technology Satellite program (ERTS), Cirrus Regional Study of Tropical Anvils and Cirrus Layers - Florida Area Cirrus Experiment (CRYSTAL - FACE) and Clouds and Water Vapor in the Climate System (CWVCS)
Martin-Marietta X-24A		Research, X-Planes,	Retired		Armstrong Flight Research Center	National Museum of the United States Air Force	Low-speed lifting body handling testbed.Lifting body aerodynamic shape trials.
Martin-Marietta X-24B		Research, X-Planes,	Retired	1973	Armstrong Flight Research Center	National Museum of the United States Air Force	Low-speed lifting body handling testbed.Lifting body aerodynamic shape trials.
McDonnell 188 (Breguet 941)	STOL		Retired (1)	1964 - 1965	Armstrong Flight Research Center, Langley Research Center		McDonnell conducted demonstrations with the prototype of French Breguet plane from June 9, 1964, to April 16, 1965. The aircraft was evaluated by both NASA and the US military
McDonnell Douglas DC-8	Fixed Wing	Research Platform, Airborne Science Program	Retired	1987-2024		Armstrong Flight Research Center	
McDonnell Douglas C-9 Skytrain II	Fixed Wing	Training, Reduced gravity aircraft	Active (1)	2005 - TBD	Johnson Space Center		Ex-USN C-9B
McDonnell Douglas F-4 Phantom II	Fixed Wing	Chase Plane	Retired		Armstrong Flight Research Center, Langley Research Center		X-15 program, Lifting body flights (also collected biomedical data and used to see if sonic booms could be used as a weapon)
McDonnell Douglas F-15A RPRV/SRV			Retired		Armstrong Flight Research Center	Armstrong Flight Research Center	
McDonnell Douglas F-15 STOL/MTD	Fixed Wing	Research Platform, advanced propulsion concepts	Retired (1)	1993 – 1999 and IFCS programs 2002 – TBD	Armstrong Flight Research Center	Armstrong Flight Research Center F-15S/MTD	The F-15B research aircraft (tail number 837), the first two-seat F-15 built by McDonnell Douglas, was used initially for developmental testing and evaluation.
McDonnell Douglas F-15B			Active (1)		Armstrong Flight Research Center	Armstrong Flight Research Center	
McDonnell Douglas F-15D			Active (2)		Armstrong Flight Research Center	Armstrong Flight Research Center	
McDonnell Douglas F/A-18 Hornet			Active (3)		Armstrong Flight Research Center	Armstrong Flight Research Center	
McDonnell Douglas F/A-18 Hornet (842NA)	Fixed Wing	Research	Retired		Armstrong Flight Research Center	Clear Channel Stadium	
McDonnell Douglas F/A-18 HARV	Fixed Wing	Research, High Alpha Research Vehicle	Retired		Armstrong Flight Research Center	Virginia Air and Space Center (840NA)	
McDonnell Douglas X-36		Research, X-Planes,	Retired	1997	Armstrong Flight Research Center	National Museum of the United States Air Force	28% scale tailless fighter testbed.
McCulloch J-2	Rotorcraft	Civil Test	Retired? (1)	1973	Langley Research Center		
Micro Craft X-43 Hyper-X		Research, X-Planes,	Retired	2001	Armstrong Flight Research Center		Scramjet hypersonic testbed (Mach 9.68) (110,000 ft).
NASA X-57		Research, X-Planes,	In Development (1)	2021	Armstrong Flight Research Center		Fully electric powered aircraft demonstrator.
MIT Daedalus	Fixed Wing	Research, Human Powered	Retired (1)	1988	Armstrong Flight Research Center	Museum of Science (Boston)	
NASA AD-1	Fixed Wing	Research, Oblique Wing	Retired (1)	1979 - 1982	Ames Research Center, Armstrong Flight Research Center	Hiller Aviation Museum	Successfully demonstrated an aircraft wing that could be pivoted obliquely from zero to 60 degrees during flight.
NASA Hyper III	Fixed Wing, UAV		Retired (1)		Armstrong Flight Research Center		
NASA Mini-Sniffer	Fixed Wing, UAV	Research, atmosphere, high altitude	Retired (3)	1975 - 1982	Langley Research Center, Armstrong Flight Research Center		
NASA M2-F1	Fixed Wing	Model	Retired (1)		Ames Research Center, Armstrong Flight Research Center	Armstrong Flight Research Center	The NASA M2-F1 was a lightweight, unpowered prototype aircraft, developed to flight test the wingless Lifting body concept. It looked like a "flying bathtub," and was designated the M2–F1, the "M" referring to "manned" and "F" referring to "flight" version. In 1962, NASA Dryden management approved a program to build a lightweight, unpowered Lifting body prototype. It featured a plywood shell placed over a tubular steel frame crafted at Dryden. Construction was completed in 1963.
NASA Paresev	Fixed Wing, Paraglider	Research, Space Capsule Safety (1)	Retired (4)	1961 - 1965		Smithsonian National Air and Space Museum	Was designed to study the ability of the Rogallo wing, also called Parawing, to descend a payload such as the Gemini space capsule safely from high altitude to ground. Specifically, the Paresev was a test vehicle used to learn how to control this paraglider for a safe landing at a normal airfield.
NASA X-43	Fixed Wing, UAV	Research, X-Planes	Retired (3)		Langley Research Center, Armstrong Flight Research Center		
North American AJ Savage	Fixed Wing	Trainer, Reduced gravity aircraft	Retired (3)	1960 - TBD			
North American A3J-1 Vigilante	Fixed Wing	Research - Supersonic transport program	Retired (3)		Armstrong Flight Research Center		A3J-1 147858 to NASA as 858. Brought from NAS Patuxent River and spent one year at in support of supersonic transport program.
North American F-82 Twin Mustang	Fixed Wing	Research, Handling & Performance	Retired (1)		Langley Research Center		
North American F-86 Sabre	Fixed Wing	Chase	Retired		Armstrong Flight Research Center		
North American F-100 Super Sabre	Fixed Wing		Retired		Armstrong Flight Research Center		
North American OV-10 Bronco	Fixed Wing	Research, Noise & Wave Turbulence	Retired		Langley Research Center		
North American X-15 (Rocket plane)	Fixed Wing	Research, X-Planes, Hypersonic Flight	Retired (1)	1959 - 1968	Armstrong Flight Research Center	Smithsonian National Air and Space Museum	Conceived by NACA, three were built and explored the regime of hypersonic flight, often regarded as a direct predecessor to the Space Shuttle
North American X-15A-2			Retired		Armstrong Flight Research Center	National Museum of the United States Air Force	
North American XB-70A Valkyrie	Fixed Wing	Research,	Retired (1), Crashed (1)	1965 - 1969	Ames Research Center, Armstrong Flight Research Center	National Museum of the United States Air Force	NASA participated heavily in the design and testing of the XB-70 Valkyrie in the mid to late 1960s. NASA and the United States Air Force had a joint agreement to use the second XB–70A prototype for high–speed research flights in support of the proposed SST program. These plans went awry on June 8, 1966, when the second XB–70 crashed following a midair collision with NASA's F–104N chase plane. After 33 research flights following the mid–air collision, the remaining XB–70A was flown to Wright-Patterson Air Force Base on February 4, 1969, for museum display.
North American YF-93	Fixed Wing	Research,	Retired (2)		Ames Research Center, Armstrong Flight Research Center		
North American F-107			Retired		Armstrong Flight Research Center	Pima Air & Space Museum (#1) (55–5118)	
Northrop HL-10	Fixed Wing	Research, Lifting body	Retired (1)		Ames Research Center, Armstrong Flight Research Center	Armstrong Flight Research Center	
Northrop M2-F2	Fixed Wing	Research, Lifting body	Retired (1)		Ames Research Center, Armstrong Flight Research Center		
Northrop M2-F3	Fixed Wing	Research, Lifting body	Retired (1)		Ames Research Center, Armstrong Flight Research Center	Smithsonian National Air and Space Museum	
Northrop T-38 Talon	Fixed Wing	Trainer	Active, Retired	1960s - Today		El Paso Forward Operating Location, Ellington Field, Houston, Texas	Used as a jet trainer for its astronauts since the 1960s.
Northrop X-4 Bantam		Research, X-Planes,	Retired	1948	Armstrong Flight Research Center	Air Force Flight Test Center Museum#Air Force Flight Test Museum	Evaluated handling characteristics of tailless aircraft in the transonic speed region.
Northrop-Grumman F-5E modified	Fixed Wing	Research, Shaped Sonic Boom Demonstration (SSBD)	Retired (1)	2003–2007	Armstrong Flight Research Center, Langley Research Center	Valiant Air Command Warbird Museum	The Shaped Sonic Boom Demonstration was a two-year program that used an F-5E with a modified fuselage in order to demonstrate that the aircraft's shockwave, and accompanying sonic boom, can be shaped and thereby reduced.
Northrop Grumman RQ-4 Global Hawk	Fixed Wing, UAV	Research Platform, Airborne Science Program	Active (2)		Armstrong Flight Research Center	Armstrong Flight Research Center	
Orbital Sciences X-34	Fixed Wing	Research, X-Planes,	Retired	Never flew		National Museum of the United States Air Force	Reusable unmanned space plane testbed.
OMAC Laser 300	Fixed Wing	Civil Test	Retired (3)		Langley Research Center		
Piper PA-30 Twin Comanche			Retired		Armstrong Flight Research Center	Kings River Community College (808NA)	
Pitcairn PAA-1	V/STOL	Research,	Retired (1)		Langley Research Center		
Rockwell RPRV-870 HiMAT	Fixed Wing, UAV	Research, Highly Maneuverable Aircraft Technology	Retired (2)		Ames Research Center, Armstrong Flight Research Center	Smithsonian National Air and Space Museum	
Rockwell-MBB X-31	Fixed Wing	Research, X-Planes, Enhanced Fighter Maneuverability (EFM)	Retired (1), Crashed (2)		Armstrong Flight Research Center, European Aeronautic, Defense and Space Company	Oberschleißheim Museum (part of the Deutsches Museum)	
Rutan VariEze	Fixed Wing	Research, Civil Air	Active		Langley Research Center		
Ryan VZ-3 Vertiplane	VTOL	Experimental VTOL aircraft	Retired (1)		Moffett Federal Airfield	United States Army Aviation Museum	
Ryan XV-5 Vertifan	V/STOL	Research, Rescue Research	Retired (1)		Ames Research Center	United States Army Aviation Museum	
Scaled Composites X-38		Research, X-Planes,	Retired (2)	1999	Armstrong Flight Research Center	Evergreen Aviation & Space Museum (V-131), Strategic Air and Space Museum(V-132)	Lifting body Crew Return Vehicle demonstrator.
Systems Integration Evaluation Remote Research Aircraft (SIERRA)	Fixed Wing, UAV	Research Platform, Airborne Science Program	Crashed (1)		Ames Research Center	Lost at Sea	
Schweizer X-26 Frigate		Research, X-Planes,	Retired	1967	Armstrong Flight Research Center	National Soaring Museum (1-36)	Training glider for yaw-roll couplingQuiet observation aircraft testbed.
Sikorsky CH-54B Tarhe	Rotorcraft	Utility	Retired (1)	18 Mar 1972 - 15 Jan 1974	Langley Research Center	Firefighting helicopter	NASA s/n was NASA 539. Now owned by US Leaseco Inc Aurora, OR, US https://www.helis.com/database/cn/5060/
Sikorsky H-19	Rotorcraft	Utility	Retired (1)		Langley Research Center		
Sikorsky S-72, RSRA	V/STOL	Research,	Retired (2)	1979-?	Ames Research Center, Armstrong Flight Research Center		RSRA, Rotor Systems Research Aircraft
Vought F-8 Crusader (Fly by Wire)	Fixed Wing	Research Platform, Digital Fly–By–Wire Control System	Retired (1)	1970s	Armstrong Flight Research Center	Armstrong Flight Research Center	Technology has become standard on modern high performance military aircraft.
Vought F-8 Crusader (Supercritical wing)	Fixed Wing	Research Platform, Supercritical wing	Retired (1)	1970s	Armstrong Flight Research Center	Armstrong Flight Research Center	Technology has become standard on modern high performance military aircraft.
Vought XF8U-3 Crusader III	Fixed Wing	Research, Atmospheric Platform	Retired (3)	1958-?			
eXperimental Sensor-Controller Aerial Vehicle (XSCAV)	Fixed Wing, UAV	Research Platform, Airborne Science Program	Active (1)		Ames Research Center	Ames Research Center	
