= Shuttle Mission Simulator =

NASA simulators of the Space Shuttle

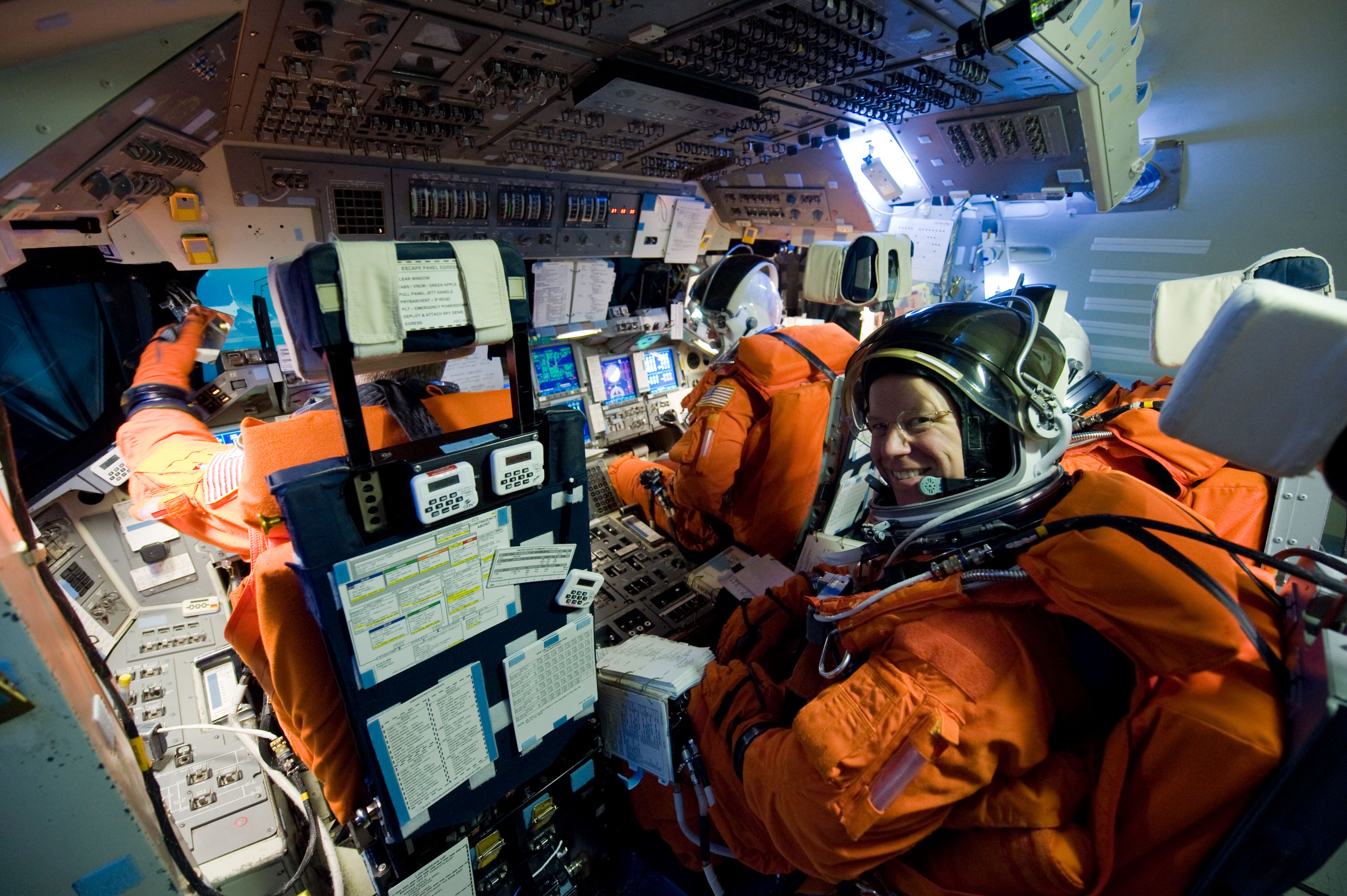
Astronauts training for STS-133 in the MBS during 2010

Shuttle Mission Simulator (SMS) was an umbrella term for three separate simulators for training Space Shuttle crews at the Johnson Space Center (JSC). The simulators were the MBS (Motion Base Simulator), the FBS (Fixed Base Simulator), and the GNS (an acronym for its original name, Guidance and Navigation Simulator).

== Description ==
The MBS consisted of the forward part of the flight deck of the Space Shuttle. It utilized a six-axis hexapod motion system with an additional extended pitch axis to provide motion cuing for all phases of flight. The FBS and GNS were fixed-base simulators which included high-fidelity mockups of the flight deck of a Space Shuttle, as well as a low-fidelity mockup of the middeck.

While the MBS provided crews with computer generated visual scenes out of the forward windows only, the FBS and the GNS were capable of supplying forward, aft, and overhead window views.

== Location at JSC ==
The FBS and the MBS were in Building 5, while the GNS was in Building 35. Before a flight, astronauts logged many hours in these simulators. Instructor stations in the complex allowed simulator instructors to monitor and control student progress in the simulations, including the insertion of malfunctions. A central simulation control office monitored the health of the facility, scheduled its use, and responded to maintenance requests.

== Simulations ==
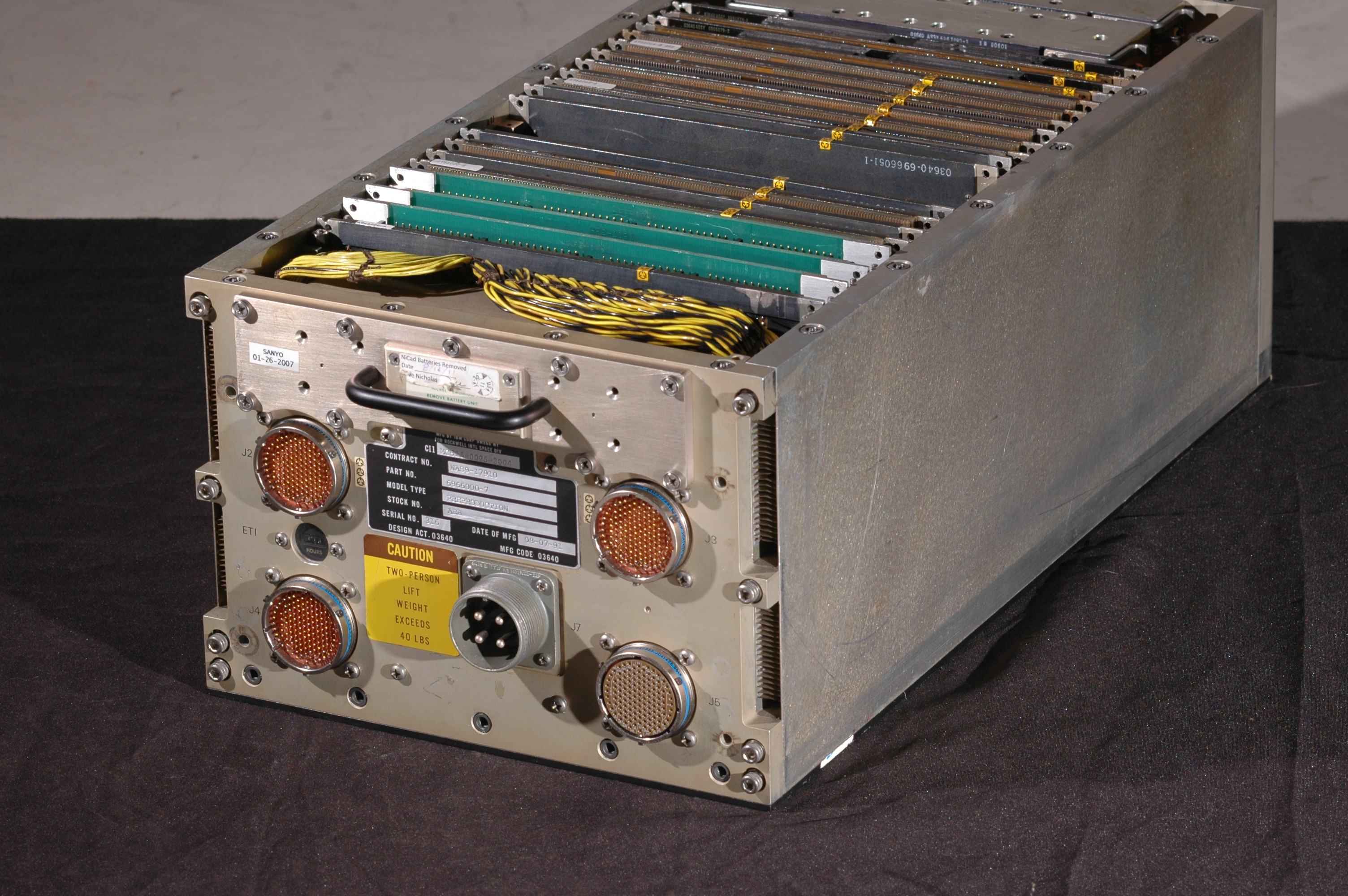
NASA Space Shuttle General Purpose Computer, 1991. This computer was used in the Shuttle Mission Simulator.

Simulation software modeled all Space Shuttle systems including many pre-programmed malfunctions, response to cockpit controls, and interactions between systems.

Depending on training requirements, simulations were conducted with varying levels of interconnection with other simulators or control centers, each of which had a unique identifier used internally within the training and flight control divisions.

- Simulations (or "sims") which took place without interfacing to the Mission Control Center (MCC) were called standalone simulations.
- Any of the simulators could be interfaced to the Mission Control Center to exercise an integrated simulation using the Network Simulation System (NSS) which also simulated ground stations and satellite networks.
- The fixed-base simulators could be interfaced to the Space Station Training Facility to exercise a combined simulation.
- A full mission rehearsal simulation, involving both the Shuttle and Station simulators, and both Mission Control Centers, was called a dual integrated simulation.
- Interfacing with payload control facilities at Marshall Space Flight Center or Goddard Space Flight Center, with the control centers of Space Station Program international partners, and/or with the Neutral Buoyancy Laboratory was also possible as a joint integrated simulation.

The less complex standalone sim was controlled by the instructors in the simulator instructor station, who also portrayed the flight controllers. A dedicated console area in the Mission Control Center, called the Simulation Control Area (SCA), controlled simulation conduct during integrated activities while the instructors operated the simulator itself.

== Disposition to museums ==
As the Space Shuttle Program ended in July 2011, all the simulators in JSC's SMS complex were mothballed and prepared for removal and transport as excess NASA inventory throughout 2012. None of the three bases remain on display at the location originally assigned.

- The FBS was shipped to Chicago where it was originally planned to be an attraction at the Adler Planetarium, but in 2016 it was transferred to the Stafford Air & Space Museum in Weatherford, Oklahoma.
- The MBS was planned to be used in the Aerospace Engineering department at Texas A&M University starting in 2013, but due to funding issues, the simulator remained in storage until mid-2021. At that time its cockpit was returned to the Johnson Space Center and a team of volunteers started restoring it for display. On April 12, 2022, the Motion Base cockpit was transferred to the Lone Star Flight Museum in Houston for permanent public display.
- The GNS was delivered to the Wings of Dreams Aviation Museum at the Keystone Heights Airport in Starke, Florida in 2012, but in 2018 the owner was forced to liquidate the museum's collection. In 2021 the GNS was shipped to the Pima Air & Space Museum in Tucson, Arizona for display after being used as a movie prop for Moonfall (film).

== See also ==
- Shuttle Training Aircraft
