= NASA 515 =

Type of aircraft

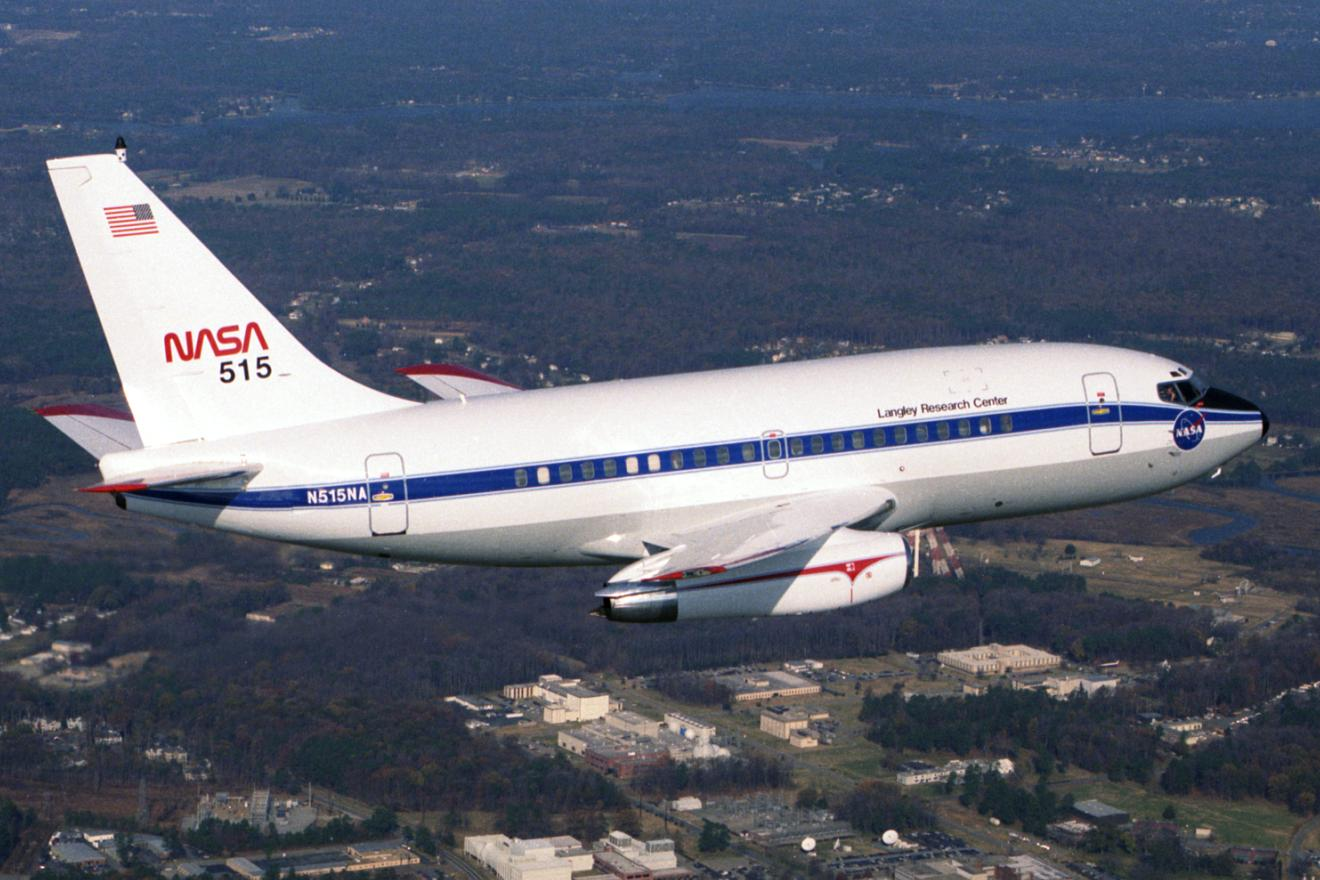
- NASA 515 in flight

General information
- Type: Boeing 737-130
- Manufacturer: Boeing Aircraft Company
- Status: Retired
- Owners: Boeing; NASA
- Registration: N515NA

History
- First flight: April 9, 1967
- Preserved at: Museum of Flight
- Fate: On display at Museum of Flight since September 21, 2003

NASA 515 is a heavily modified Boeing 737 for NASA use as a continuing research facility. The aircraft was the first 737 built and was used by Boeing to qualify the 737 design. NASA 515 was maintained and flown by Langley Research Center as part of the Terminal Area Productivity (TAP) program.

After its use by NASA was concluded in 2003, the aircraft was preserved, and is on public display at the Museum of Flight, near Seattle, Washington. It is the last Boeing 737-100 still in existence.

== See also ==
- List of NASA aircraft
