= Center for Earth Resources Observation and Science =

US Geological Survey data management, systems development, and research field center

Coordinates: 43.735926°N 96.625324°W

The Center for Earth Resources Observation and Science (EROS) is a United States Geological Survey data management, systems development, and research field center. It serves as the national archive of remotely sensed images of the Earth's land surface acquired by civilian satellites and aircraft. EROS is located northeast of Sioux Falls, South Dakota, between Baltic and Garretson.

In the 1960s the federal government decided it needed a single facility to handle and distribute Landsat satellite data. A study determined that such a data center be located where it could receive transmissions directly from a satellite passing over any part of the conterminous United States. This limited the location to an elliptical area that stretched from Topeka, Kansas, to just north of Sioux Falls. A rural location was also recommended to avoid radio and TV interference.

South Dakota Senator Karl Mundt worked with local business leaders in South Dakota to buy the land necessary for the data center and in 1970 it was announced that the Sioux Falls area had been chosen as the site for EROS. Construction started shortly thereafter and the facility opened on August 7, 1973.

== Operation ==
EROS has nearly 600 government and contractor employees. It is staffed by USGS employees and employees from private industry that work under contract to support EROS' mission.

== See also ==
- Airborne Science Program
