= NASA Hyper III =

Hyper III
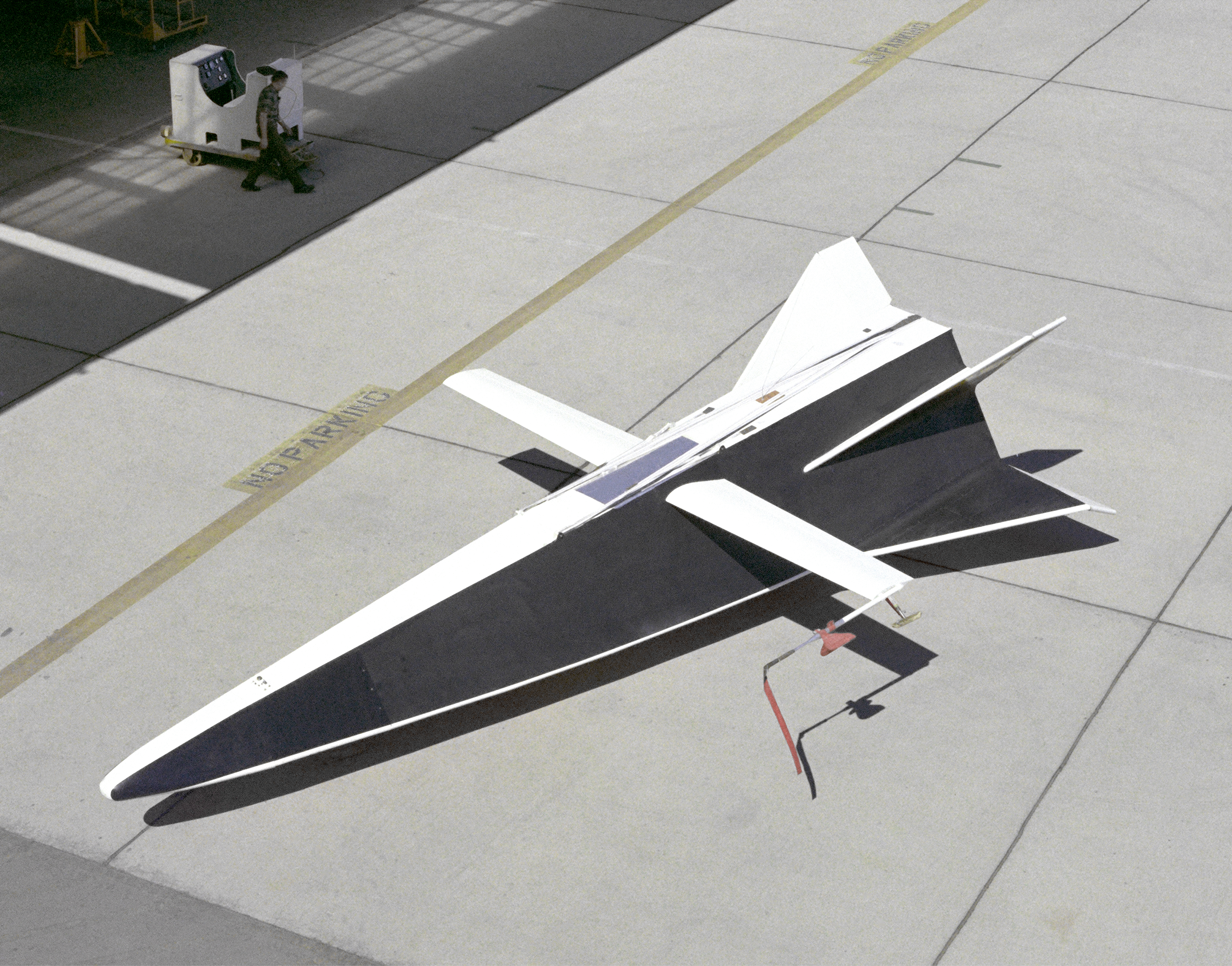

General information
- Type: Lifting-body remotely piloted vehicle
- National origin: United States
- Manufacturer: National Aeronautics and Space Administration
- Designer: Dale Reed
- Primary user: NASA
- Number built: 1

History
- First flight: 12 December 1969

The NASA Hyper III was an American unpowered full-scale lifting body remotely piloted vehicle designed and built at the NASA Flight Research Center at Edwards Air Force Base, California.

== Design and development ==
The Hyper III was designed to help in the M2 lifting body program, it had a flat bottom and sides, and a simple straight wing with no control surfaces that was designed to simulate a pop-out wing that had been proposed for a re-entry vehicle. The Hyper III had twin fins and rudders canted at 40° from the vertical, and hinged elevons on the horizontal surface. The landing gear was a fixed tricycle type, using spring steel legs from a Cessna aircraft. It was fitted with an emergency parachute system and controlled by 5-channel radio link; instrument data was downlinked using a 12-channel radio.

On 12 December 1969 the Hyper III was launched from a helicopter at 10,000 feet. It glided 5 km, turned round, came back and landed. After the three-minute flight it was not flown again as the Center cancelled the program.

== Specifications ==
Data from Jane's All the World's Aircraft 1973-74

General characteristics

- Length: 32 ft 0 in (9.75 m)
- Wingspan: 15 ft 0 in (4.57 m)
- Height: 7 ft 6 in (2.29 m)
- Wing area: 35.41 sq ft (3.29 m^{2})
- Empty weight: 950 lb (431 kg)
- Gross weight: 950 lb (431 kg)

Performance

- Maximum speed: 173 mph (277 km/h, 150 kn)
- Stall speed: 69 mph (111 km/h, 60 kn)
- Range: 11 mi (18 km, 9.6 nmi)
- Service ceiling: 12,000 ft (3,660 m)

== See also ==
- NASA M2-F1

Related lists

- List of NASA aircraft
- List of experimental aircraft
