= Airborne Science Program =

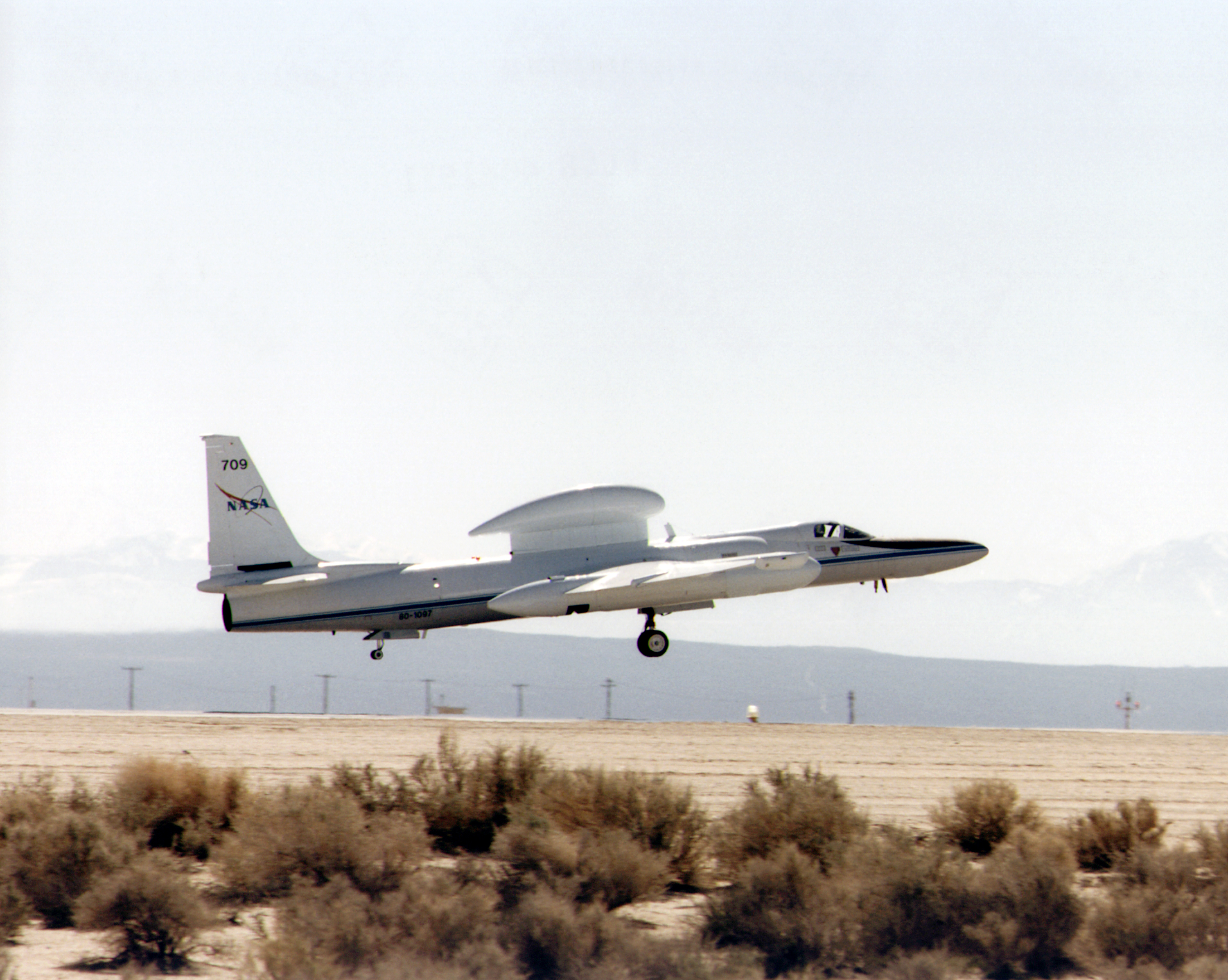
ER-2 #709 takes off from NASA Dryden

NASA's Airborne Science Program is administered from the NASA Neil A. Armstrong Flight Research Center, in Edwards, California. The program supports the sub-orbital flight requirements of NASA's Earth Science Enterprise. Dryden maintains and operates two ER-2 high-altitude "satellite simulator" aircraft and a DC-8 which is specially configured as a "flying laboratory" in service from 1987 to May 2024.

The scientific disciplines that employ these aircraft include Earth sciences, astronomy, atmospheric chemistry, climatology, oceanography, archeology, ecology, forestry, geography, geology, hydrology, meteorology, volcanology and biology. The DC-8 and ER-2 are also important tools for the development of sensors intended to fly aboard future Earth-observing satellites, and to validate and calibrate the sensors which are used onboard satellites which currently orbit the Earth.

== NASA research aircraft types operated ==
=== Present ===
Aircraft	Number in service	Introduced	Research Center
McDonnell Douglas DC-8	1	1987 (end in 2024)	Armstrong Flight Research Center
Lockheed ER-2	2	1981	Armstrong Flight Research Center
Gulfstream C-20A	1	2008	Armstrong Flight Research Center
Gulfstream III	1	2012	Johnson Space Center
Gulfstream III	1	2012	Langley Research Center
Gulfstream V	1	2012	Johnson Space Center
Lockheed P-3 Orion	1	1991	Wallops Flight Facility

== Media ==
Airborne Science Safari 2000 Mission

ER-2 in Sweden for the Sage III Ozone Loss and Validation Experiment

== See also ==
- Center for Earth Resources Observation and Science
