= Shuttle Training Aircraft =

Training aircraft for the Space Shuttle

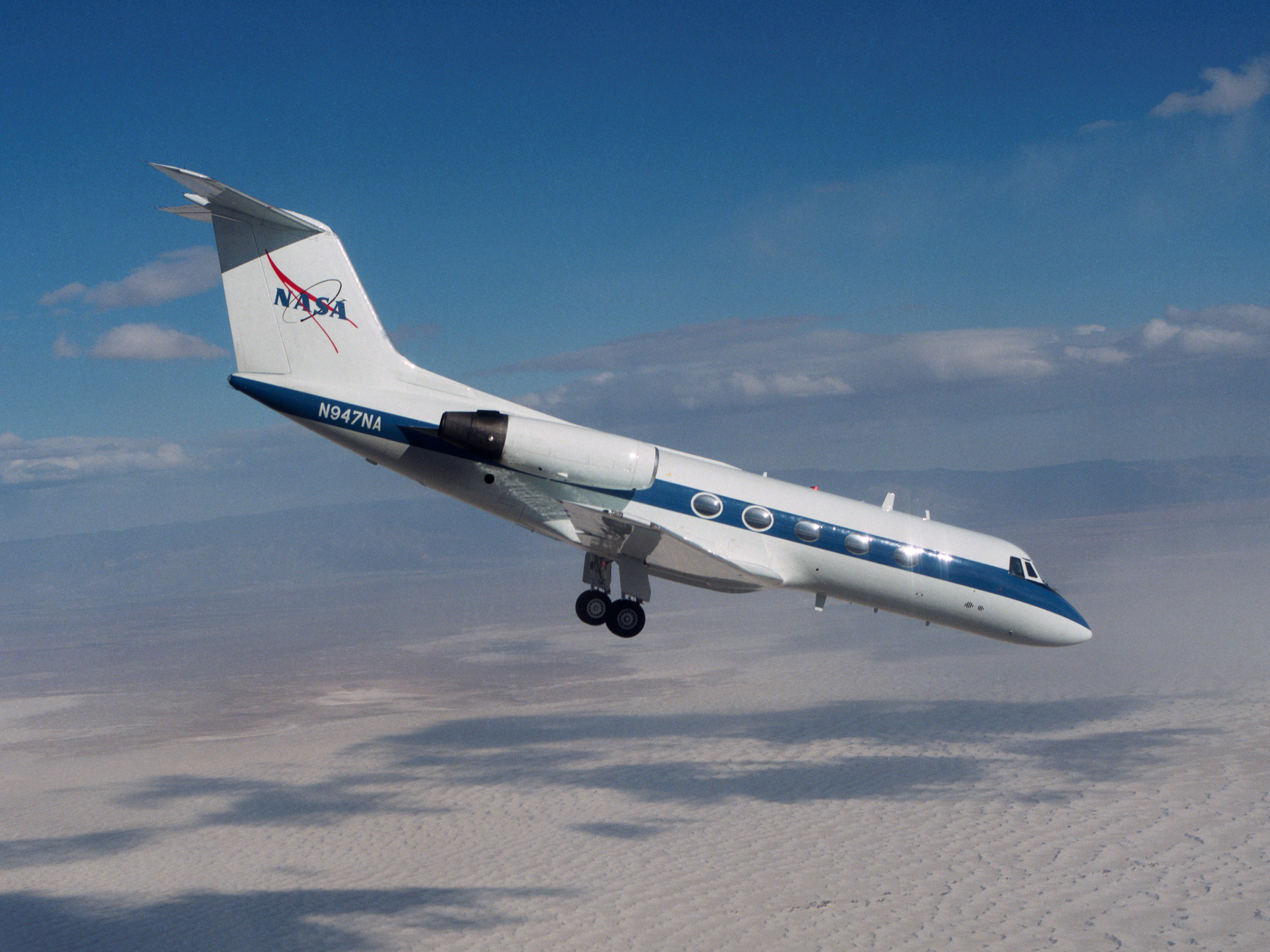

General information
- Type: Advanced trainer
- Manufacturer: Grumman
- Status: Retired
- Primary user: NASA
- Number built: 4

History
- Retired: 2012
- Developed from: Grumman Gulfstream II

The Shuttle Training Aircraft (STA) is a former NASA training vehicle that duplicated the Space Shuttle's approach profile and handling qualities, allowing pilots to simulate Shuttle landings under controlled conditions before attempting the task on board the orbiter. The STA was also flown to assess weather conditions just prior to Space Shuttle launches and landings.

== Development ==
NASA developed the STA using the Grumman Gulfstream II as the underlying aircraft platform. During the early phases of the Shuttle program, NASA considered using the Boeing 737 airliner as the basis for the STA, but rejected it due to cost and opted for the less-expensive Gulfstream II.

The aircraft's exterior was modified to withstand the high aerodynamic forces incurred during training sorties. A redesigned cockpit provided a high-fidelity simulation of the Shuttle Orbiter's controls and pilot vantage point; even the seats were fitted in the same position as those in the Space Shuttle.

== Operational history ==
The four STAs were normally located at the NASA Forward Operating Location in El Paso, Texas and rotated through Ellington Field (Houston, Texas) for maintenance. The STA was also used at Kennedy Space Center in Florida. It was primarily flown by astronauts practicing landings at the Shuttle Landing Facility and White Sands Space Harbor as well as to assess weather conditions prior to Space Shuttle launches and landings.

On December 3, 2003, a NASA Gulfstream II Shuttle Training Aircraft (STA) was flying a series of simulated shuttle landings to the Kennedy Space Center shuttle landing facility. On board the aircraft was an unidentified NASA astronaut pilot and two training personnel. The aircraft was on final approach at 13,000 feet when onboard instruments indicated a malfunction on one of the jet engine thrust reversers. The aircraft landed safely. A post-landing inspection showed that one of the 585-pound, 4-foot-wide, 5-foot-long thrust reversers had fallen off the aircraft. Divers later found the thrust reverser on the bottom of the nearby Banana River. An investigation showed that a bolt failed, releasing the part from the aircraft.

== Flight profile ==
The STA was particularly critical for Shuttle pilots in training because the Orbiter lacked atmospheric engines that would allow the craft to go-around after a poor approach. After re-entry, the Shuttle was a very heavy glider (it was affectionately referred to as a 'flying brick') and as such had only one chance to land successfully.

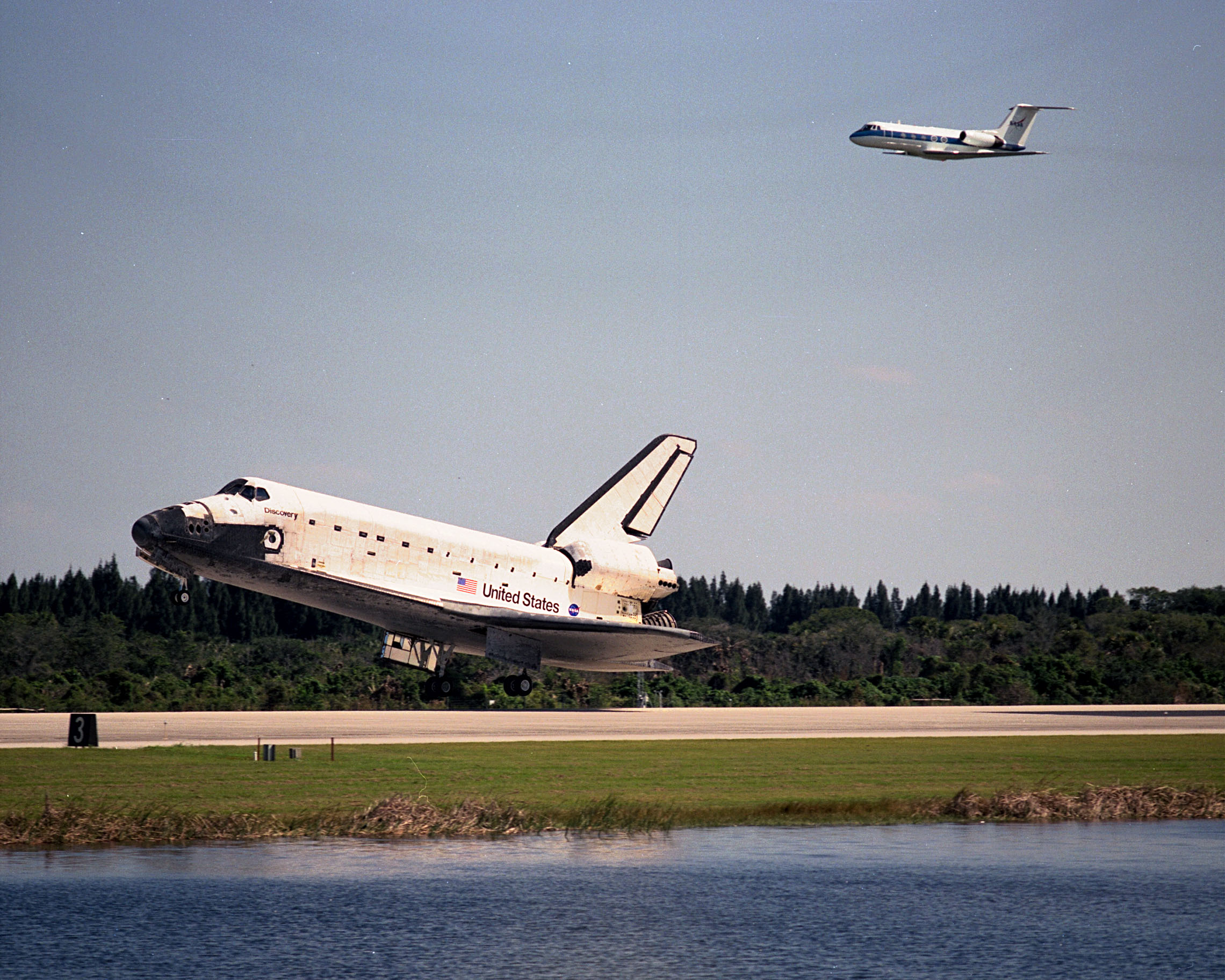
An STA flying above Discovery as it lands at the conclusion of STS-95 in 1998

To match the descent rate and drag profile of the real Shuttle at 37,000 feet (11,300 m), the main landing gear of the C-11A was lowered (the nose gear stayed retracted due to wind load constraints) and engine thrust was reversed. Its flaps could deflect upwards to decrease lift as well as downwards to increase lift.

Covers were placed on the left hand cockpit windows to provide the same view as from a Shuttle cockpit, and the left-hand pilot's seat was fitted with the same controls as a Shuttle. The STA's normal flight controls were moved to the right, where the instructor sat. Both seat positions had a head-up display (HUD).

In a normal exercise, the pilot descended to 20,000 feet (6,000 m) at an airspeed of 280 knots (519 km/h), 15 miles (24 km) from the landing target. The pilot then rolled the STA at 12,000 feet (3,700 m), 7 miles (11 km) from landing. The nose of the aircraft was then dropped to increase speed to 300 knots (560 km/h), descending at a 20-degree angle on the outer glide slope (OGS). The outer glide slope aiming point was 7,500 feet (2,286 m) short of the runway threshold, and used PAPIs for visual guidance in addition to the MLS system. At 2,000 feet (610 m) the guidance system changed to pre-flare and shortly after, at 1,700 feet (518 m), the pilot started the flare maneuver to gradually reduce the descent angle and transition to the inner glide slope (IGS) which was 1.5 degrees from 300 feet (91 m) onwards, using a "ball-bar" system for visual guidance. The shuttle landing gear release was simulated at 300 feet (90 m) above the ground, since the STA main gear remained down for the whole simulation. The nose gear of the STA was lowered at 150 ft (46 m) AGL in case of an inadvertent touchdown with the runway surface.

If the speed was correct, a green light on the instrument panel simulated shuttle landing when the pilot's eyes were 32 feet (10 m) above the runway. This was the exact position that the pilot's head would be in during an actual landing. In the exercise, the STA was still flying 20 feet (6 m) above the ground. The instructor pilot deselected the simulation mode, stowed the thrust reversers, and the instructor executed a go-around, never actually landing the aircraft (on training approaches).

== Avionics ==
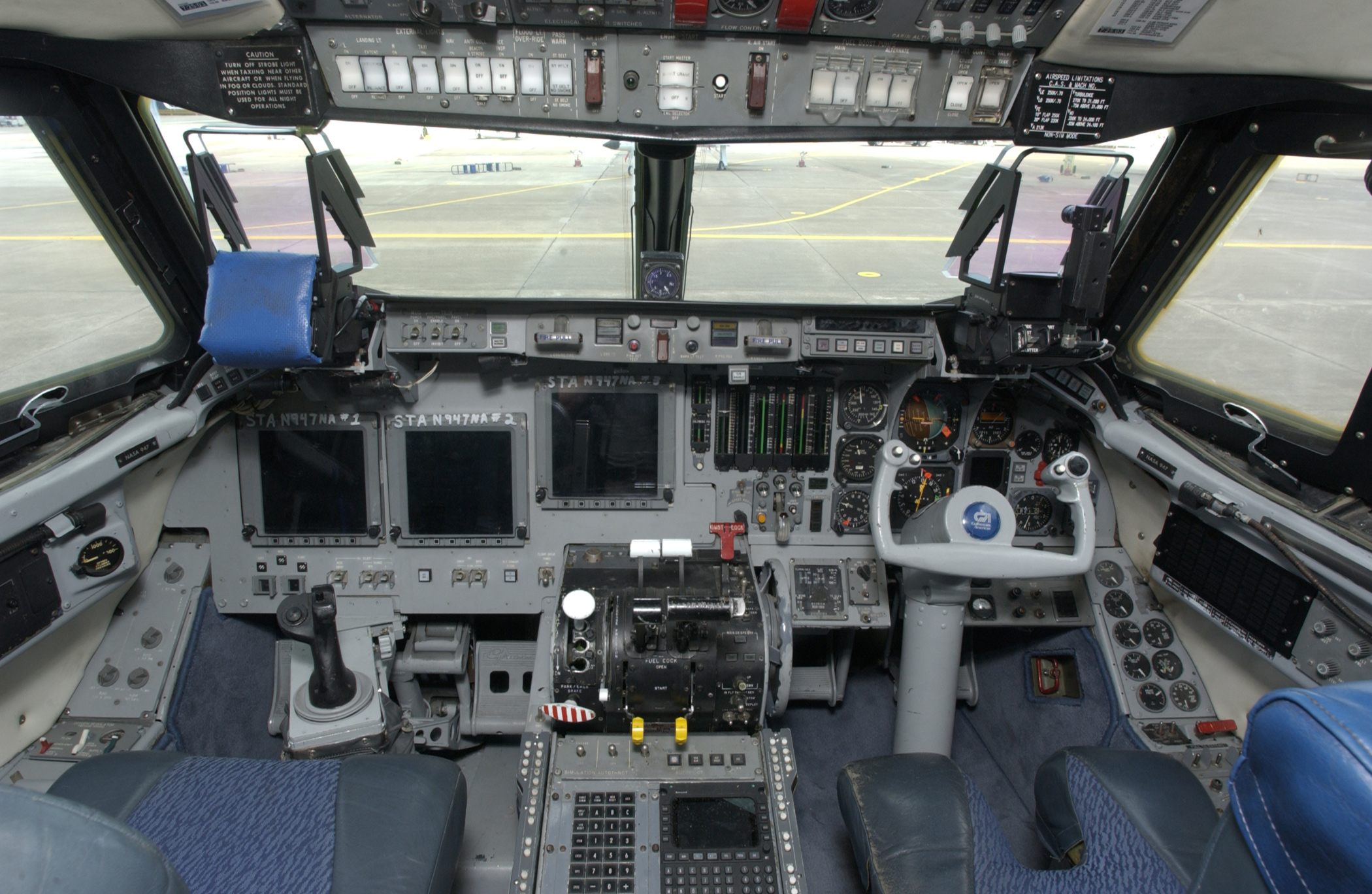
The Shuttle Training Aircraft's cockpit. The commander's side of the cockpit, at left, featured a Shuttle-type heads-up display (HUD), rotational hand controller (RHC) used to fly the vehicle, and multi-function displays. The instructor pilot, who occupied the right-hand side of the STA cockpit, had access to a similar heads-up display, as well as conventional aircraft controls and instruments.

A computer system installed on board the STA simulated the orbiter's flight dynamics with a high degree of accuracy. In addition to reproducing the orbiter's handling characteristics, the system replicated the shuttle's control interfaces, allowing pilots to train in an environment that closely resembled actual shuttle operations.

An onboard computer called the Advanced Digital Avionics System (ADAS) controlled the Direct Lift Control (DLC) and the in-flight reverse thrust during Simulation Mode.

Every shuttle commander practiced at least 1,000 landings in this manner, as had each mission's shuttle pilot.

== List of aircraft ==
Four Gulfstream II aircraft constituted the now retired STA fleet, although other Gulfstream II aircraft, lacking STA capabilities, are still used by NASA for personnel transport purposes. Although the majority of the fleet had markings similar to those pictured above, paint schemes do vary slightly across aircraft.

On August 22, 2011, NASA announced that all four Shuttle Training Aircraft would be retired at various NASA facilities around the country, with N944 retiring at the then named Dryden Flight Research Center.

The STA tail numbers were:

- NASA 944: N944NA (s/n 144) - Currently in the museum restoration storage of the Flight Test Historical Foundation located at Edwards Air Force Base.
- NASA 945: N945NA (s/n 118) — On July 13, 2017, a ribbon cutting ceremony was conducted and this aircraft is now in permanent display at the U.S. Space & Rocket Center in Huntsville, Alabama.
- NASA 946: N946NA (s/n 146) — On September 21, 2011, this aircraft became a permanent display at the Texas Air & Space Museum in Amarillo, Texas.
- NASA 947: N947NA (s/n 147) — Currently on permanent display at the Evergreen Aviation & Space Museum in McMinnville, Oregon.

== See also ==
- Shuttle Mission Simulator
- List of spaceflight-related accidents and incidents
