= Grumman Gulfstream II =

Type of airplane

G-1159 Gulfstream II
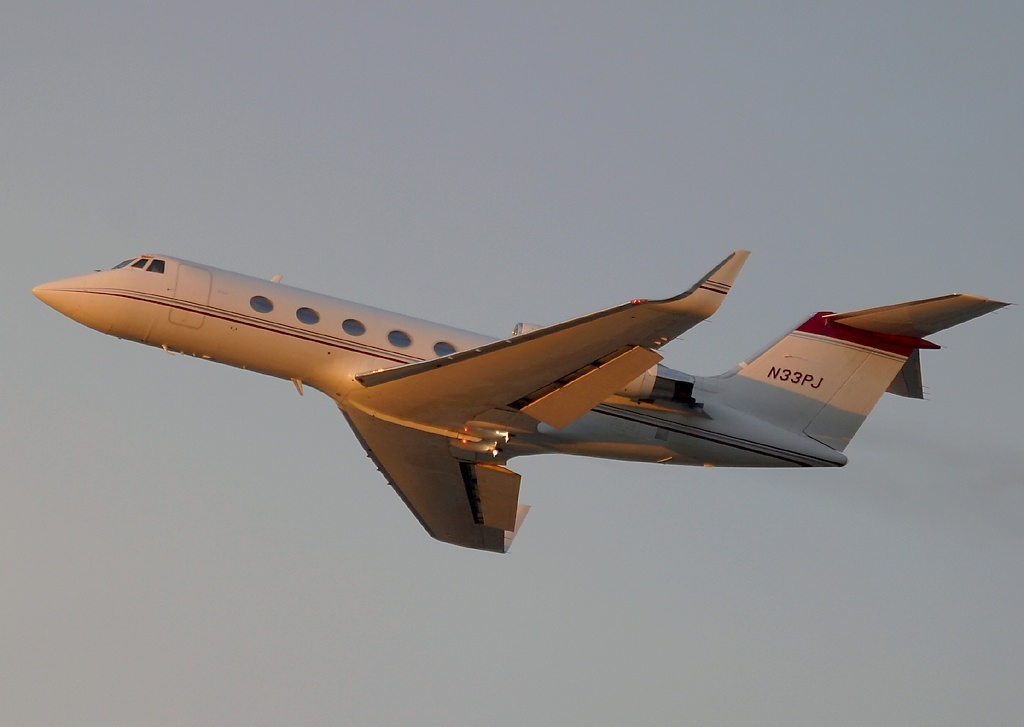

General information
- Type: Business jet
- National origin: United States
- Manufacturer: Grumman/Gulfstream Aerospace
- Status: In service
- Number built: 256

History
- Manufactured: 1967–1980
- First flight: 2 October 1966
- Developed into: Gulfstream III

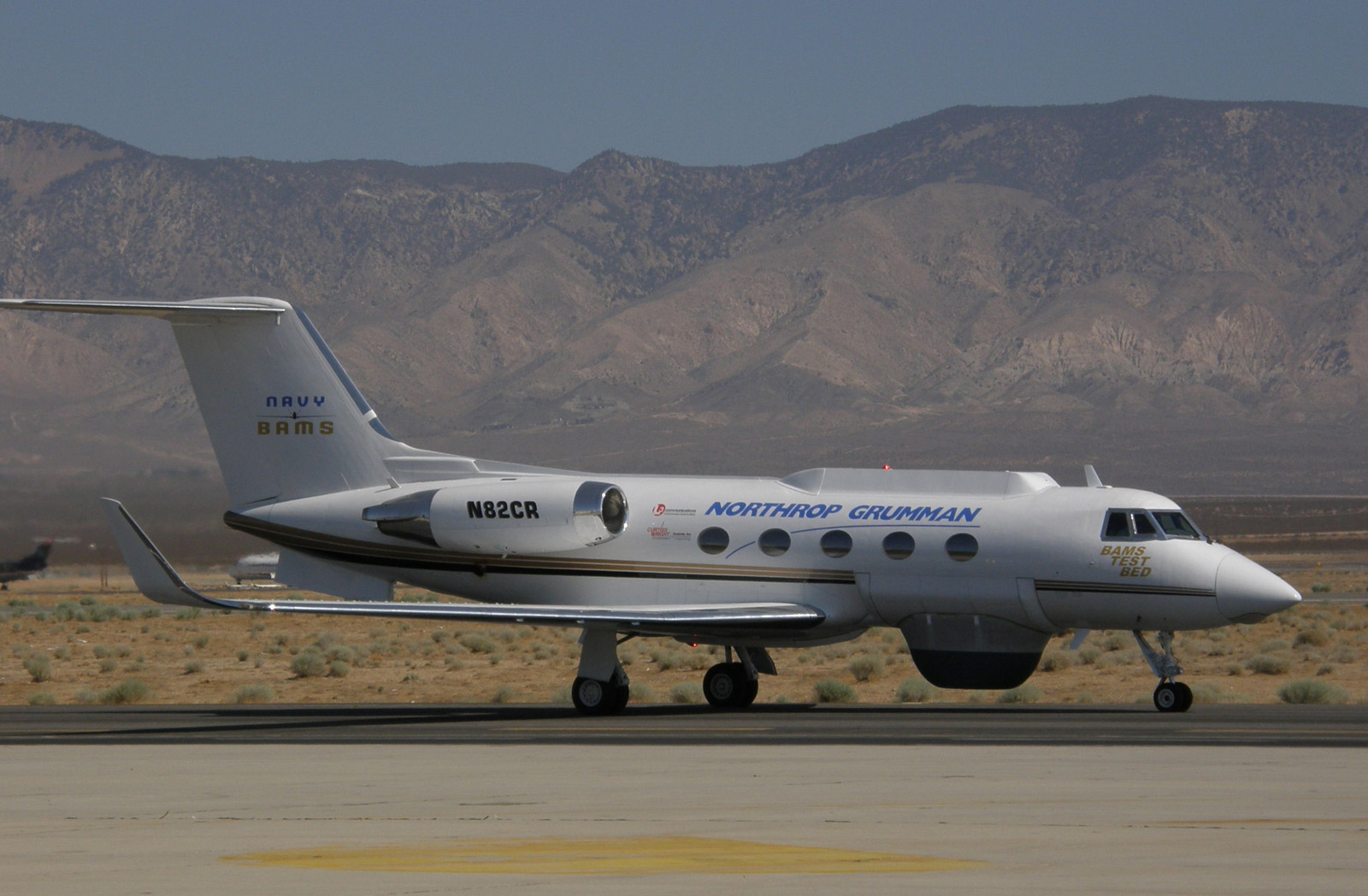
A highly modified GII used to flight test systems hardware for the Broad Area Maritime Surveillance (BAMS) UAV contract bid, seen here taxiing at Mojave

The Gulfstream II (G-II) is an American twin engine business jet designed and first built by Grumman, then Grumman American and finally Gulfstream American. It was succeeded by the Gulfstream III. The first Gulfstream II flew on October 2, 1966.

== Design ==
The Gulfstream II is a twin-engine, swept-wing, corporate jet airplane powered by two Rolls-Royce Spey turbofan engines designed to provide high speed and long range capability without sacrificing airport performance, reliability, and other operational advantages of its predecessor, the turboprop Gulfstream I. Preliminary design of the wing was influenced by both cruise and low speed considerations. The aft-mounted engine location was selected after extensive analysis and design iterations considering aerodynamic, structural, and ground clearance requirements. Airfoil geometry was developed to maximum sweep benefit from the selected planform. The interference problem at the wing-body juncture was treated by modification of the airfoil shape and thickness over the inner third of the wing span. The basic airfoils for the main area of the wing are similar to those of the Grumman A-6 Intruder aircraft and utilize NACA 6-series thickness distributions combined with an in-house mean line. A buffet boundary commensurate with the M=.85 speed capability was attained by incorporating a row of co-rotating vortex generators on the outer wing panel. In developing the wing contours, attention was paid to the aircraft's low speed requirements by tailoring the leading edge radius to preclude leading edge separation. The high lift configuration, consists of a one piece, single-slotted Fowler flap of 30% chord. Stall initiation on the basic wing was found to occur at midspan but spread rapidly to the tip, particularly at large flap deflections. The addition of an upper surface fence at about midspan provided a strong pitch down at the stall, without sacrificing maximum lift, and also afforded an adequate margin between initial and tip stall.

The high angle-of-attack investigations on the Gulfstream II indicated that stable trim conditions existed up to 45 degrees angle of attack. The elevator deflection required to trim to the primary stall at most forward center of gravity was sufficient to trim a deep stall at the aft center of gravity, but recovery from deep stall was immediate upon forward stick motion, and more than adequate nose-down elevator control was available. The acceptability of the Gulfstream II high angle of attack characteristics and the absence of a deep stall influence on configuration sizing and arrangement was attributed to the mitigating influence of the nacelle-wing overlap on nacelle contribution. Configuration buildup studies revealed the adverse nacelle influence on tail pitching moment contribution above 30 degrees angle of attack was not unduly severe and no appreciable effect on elevator or stabilizer effectiveness was found.

It was found in flight testing that the stall characteristics were satisfactory but did not preclude stall penetrations to the point of secondary stall pitchup. Rather than pursue a lengthy flight test research effort, and in view of the excellent primary stall behavior, it was decided to mechanically limit the extent of stall penetration with a stick shaker and stick pusher.

During installation of the Aviation Partners Inc. winglets (as the G-IISP), the vortex generators and midspan fence were removed and replaced with six leading edge vortilons similar to those found on the Gulfstream IV.

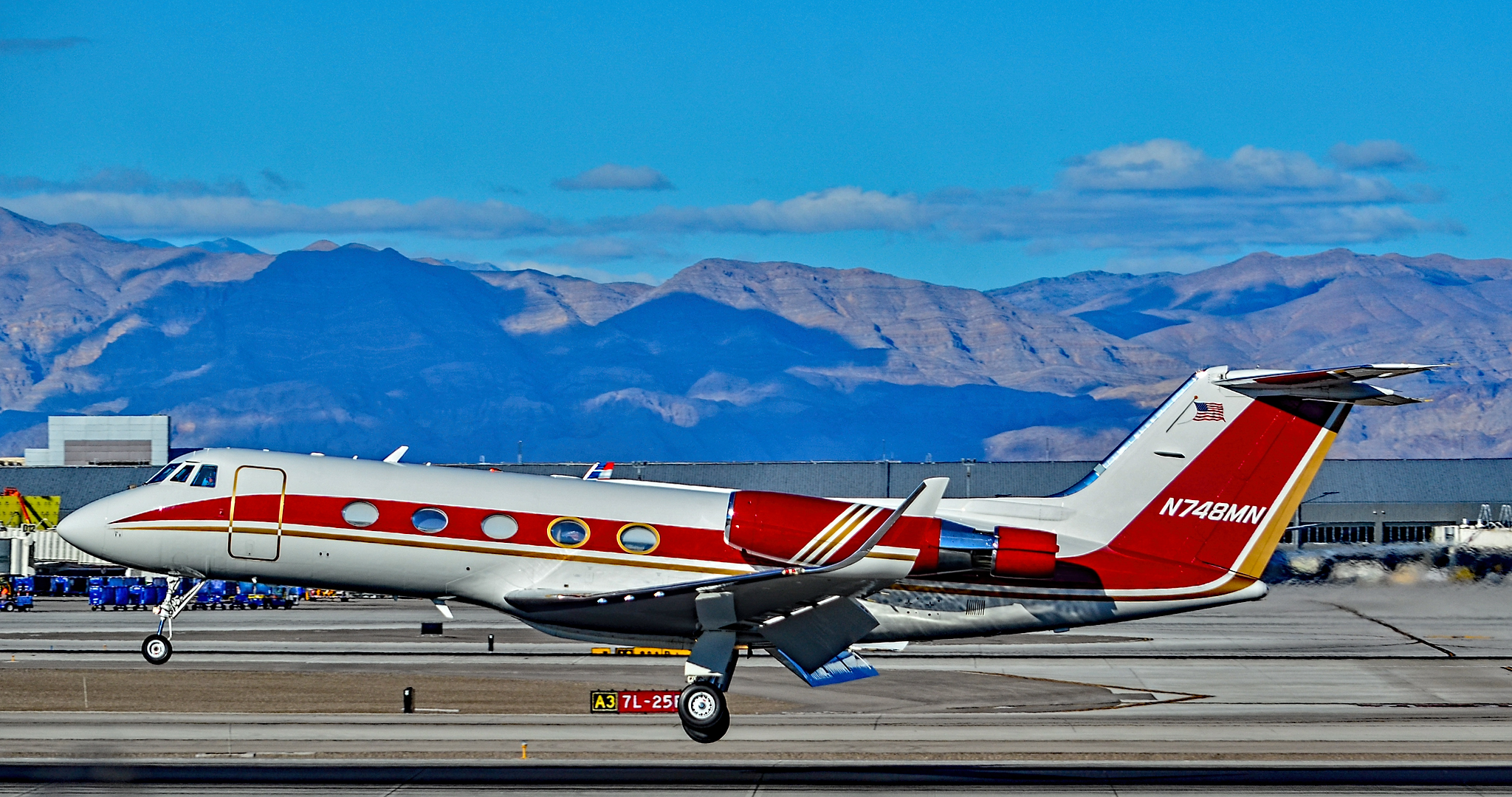
Gulfstream II-SP with hush kits installed

In 2013, the FAA modified 14 CFR part 91 rules to prohibit the operation of jets weighing 75,000 lb (34,000 kg) or less that are not stage 3 noise compliant after December 31, 2015. The Gulfstream II is listed explicitly in Federal Register 78 FR 39576. Any Gulfstream IIs that have not been modified by installing Stage 3 noise compliant engines or have not had "hushkits" installed for non-compliant engines will not be permitted to fly in the contiguous 48 states after December 31, 2015. 14 CFR §91.883 Special flight authorizations for jet airplanes weighing 75,000 pounds or less – lists special flight authorizations that may be granted for operation after December 31, 2015.

== Development ==
Grumman had delivered over 150 turboprop Gulfstream Is by the start of 1965 but were gaining competition from the jet powered Lockheed Jetstar, Hawker Siddeley HS.125, Dassault Falcon 20 and the North American Sabreliner. The new generation of business jets didn't match the range and comfort of the Gulfstream I and customers were demanding a jet powered variant of the Gulfstream I.

When the Rolls-Royce Spey second-generation turbofan became available the program became a reality and a full-scale mock up was created. With 30 firm orders, the company launched production go-ahead on 5 May 1965.

The first prototype flew from the Bethpage facility on 2 October 1966 for a 52-minute maiden flight. Four aircraft were used in the certification program and the FAA Type Certificate was awarded on 19 October 1967. Although the aircraft would not be economic to fly as an airliner, it was certified to meet public transport standards. The Gulfstream I was sold through a number of dealerships. The Gulfstream IIs were produced as green aircraft and delivered to a completion centre to fit the interior and avionics required by the customer.

The company built a new production plant in Savannah, Georgia to build the Gulfstream II which opened in 1967. The first Savannah-built aircraft flew in December 1967, production continued at Bethpage until they had completed 40 aircraft.

To increase the range of the aircraft, tip-tanks were certified in March 1976 and added as standard on the production line from aircraft #183, although the customer could opt not to fit them.

Production of the Gulfstream II ended at Savannah in December 1979. Between 1981 and 1987 43 aircraft were converted to Gulfstream IIB's with new wings and advanced avionics from the newer Gulfstream III.

== Variants ==
Gulfstream II (G-1159)
Twin-engined executive, corporate transport aircraft, with accommodation for up to 14 passengers, powered by two Rolls-Royce Spey RB.168 Mk 511-8 turbofan engines. Received FAA Type Certificate A12EA on October 19, 1967.
Gulfstream II TT
Modified version with tip tanks, increased range. FAA certified May 13, 1977.
Gulfstream IIB (G-1159B)
Modified version, with the wider, wingleted wings and instruments from the Gulfstream III, Maximum takeoff weight increased to 68,200 lb (30,900 kg). or 69,711 lb (31,620 kg). FAA certified on September 17, 1981.
Gulfstream II SP
Aircraft modified by the addition of Aviation Partners winglets. FAA certified under STC ST00080SE on April 22, 1994.
VC-11A
One VC-11A built for the US Coast Guard, outfitted with upgraded communications and a inertial navigation system. (USCG reg no 1, cn 23)
A GII (N40CE, cn 45) for the Army US Army Corps of Engineers (has been listed as both a VC-11A and a C-20, should be VC-11A).

== Special mission variants ==
Gulfstream IIs have been popular as special mission aircraft, particularly when used aircraft became available for less than $1 million.

A G-II (N105TB, cn 31) had underwing pylons and various fuselage appendages added to enable it to operate as a sensor testbed for MIT Lincoln Labs.

A G-IIB (N74A, cn 36) was modified by Aeromet of Tulsa, Oklahoma for use as the HALO1 aircraft for the US Missile Defense Agency.

A G-IISP (N82CR, cn 80) was modified for use by Northrop Grumman as a demonstrator for the Broad Area Maritime Surveillance (BAMS) contract.

A G-IIB (N178B, cn 125) was modified by the addition of a large dorsal fairing housing a telescope by Aeromet as the HALO2 aircraft for the Missile Defense Agency.

A G-IITT (N10123, cn 107) had tip tanks added containing ground mapping radar, along with fairings on the wing undersurface and a centerline pod. This aircraft operated as the Calgis Geosar and formerly owned by Earthdata Aviation, Fugro, and sold 2017. The aircraft is still in service as of April, 2018.

NASA contracted Lockheed-Georgia to modify one G-II as the Propfan Test Assessment aircraft (N650PF, cn 118). The aircraft had a nacelle added to the left wing, containing a 6,000 hp (4,500 kW) Allison 570 turboprop engine (derived from the XT701 turboshaft developed for the Boeing Vertol XCH-62 program), powering a 9 ft (2.7 m) diameter Hamilton Standard SR-7 propfan. The aircraft, so configured, first flew in March 1987. After an extensive test program, the modifications were removed from the aircraft and the aircraft became a Shuttle Training Aircraft (STA).

A modified version of the G-II, called the Shuttle Training Aircraft (STA), mimics the cockpit configuration and flight characteristics of the Space Shuttle and is used by NASA as a training airplane for practice shuttle approaches (referred to as "dives"). Four G-IIs were used for this purpose N945NA, cn 118; N944NA, cn 144; N946NA, cn 146, and N947NA, cn 147 (cn 118 above was reconfigured for this purpose).

A G-IISP (N950NA, cn 185) was modified by the addition of a wing tip pod and a ventral radome as the HALO3 aircraft for the Missile Defense Agency. This aircraft serves as a target for the Boeing YAL-1 Airborne Laser Testbed.

A G-IIB (N779LC, cn 88) has been modified with the same large dorsal fairing as N178B (HALO2), as the HALO4 aircraft for the Missile Defense Agency.

A G-II (JA8431, cn 141) is operated by Diamond Air Service in various configurations to support missions involving environmental measurements. In one configuration, it can carry two 3D X/L band PI SAR (Parametric Interpherometric Synthetic Aperture Radar) pods under the forward fuselage.

A G-IISP (N510AG, cn 159) is operated by the Orion Air Group in support Northrop Grumman's development of the multi-role, tactical-command data link (MR-TCDL). The aircraft was modified with 19 in (480 mm) and 9 in (230 mm) satcom dish-antennas, as well as additional radomes on the top and bottom.<

A G-II TT (N81RR, cn 246) was being modified for NASA, by the addition of fuselage appendages and underwing pylons, to serve as the High Ice Water Content (HIWC) sampling aircraft.

== Operators ==
=== Military operators ===
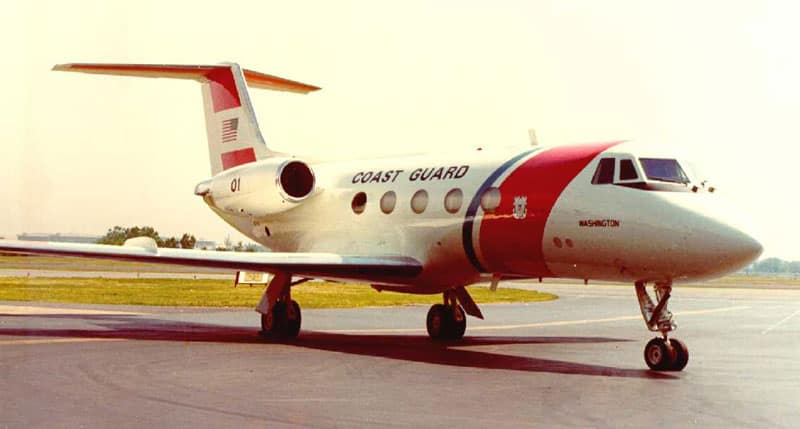
The former U.S. Coast Guard VC-11A (cn 23). Now privately owned

Chad

- Chadian Air Force

Dominican Republic

- Dominican Republic Air Force

Ecuador

- Ecuadorian Air Force

Gabon

- Military of Gabon

Libya

- Libyan Air Force

Morocco

- Royal Moroccan Air Force

Nigeria

- Nigerian Air Force

Oman
Panama
United States

- NASA
- United States Army
- United States Coast Guard

Venezuela

=== Civil operators ===
The aircraft was operated by private individuals, companies, non-government organizations and executive charter operators. A number of companies also use the aircraft as part of fractional ownership programs.

Nelson Rockefeller, Gerald Ford's vice president and scion of the Rockefeller family, personally owned a Gulfstream II (N100WK, cn 77) which he preferred to fly in over the Convair C-131 Samaritan, then being used as Air Force Two for domestic flights. As such it has the distinction of having used the "Executive Two" callsign while he was in office.

== Accidents and incidents ==
- May 3, 1982 – A Gulfstream II from the Algerian government was shot down by a fighter jet in the border area of Iraq, Iran and Turkey. All 15 people on board, including the Algerian foreign minister Mohammed Seddik Benyahia were killed.
- April 18, 1983 – Mallow Racecourse, in Ireland, became an emergency airfield when a Mexican Gulfstream II business jet made a precautionary landing. A temporary tarmacadam runway of almost 3,000 ft (900 m) in length was laid to enable the aircraft to leave five weeks later in May. A movie, The Runway, was loosely based on the incident.
- January 19, 1990 – A Gulfstream II crashed on approach to Little Rock National Airport in Little Rock, Arkansas. The plane struck guidance lights and crashed short of the runway while attempting to land in stormy weather. It was carrying employees of an Eastman Kodak Co. subsidiary when the flight was diverted to Little Rock due to unfavorable weather. All 7 on board including 2 pilots and 5 passengers were killed.
- September 4, 1991 - A Gulfstream II corporate jet owned by Dupont/Conoco crashed into a mountain slope covered in clouds on Borneo carrying 12 employees and spouses.
- 3 May 1995 – A Gulfstream II operated by American Jet, inbound from Buenos Aires via La Paz, selected the wrong VOR frequency during a nighttime approach to Quito; the jet flew 12 miles (19 km) further south than it should have, striking the Sincholagua volcano at 16,000 feet (4,900 m). All seven occupants were killed. The flight was carrying a number of important oil executives from Argentina and Chile to a meeting in Quito. Amongst those killed was Argentine YPF's CEO and president José Estenssoro, who had led privatization efforts under Carlos Menem; Juan Pedrals Gili, the Spanish-born general manager of Chilean ENAP as well as Manfred Hecht Mittersteiner, chief of production at ENAP's international subsidiary Sipetrol.

== Aircraft on display ==
United States

- Gulfstream II Serial #001 was donated to the Carolinas Aviation Museum in Charlotte, North Carolina. It is intact but in storage awaiting the development of another addition to the Museum.

== Specifications (Gulfstream II-B) ==
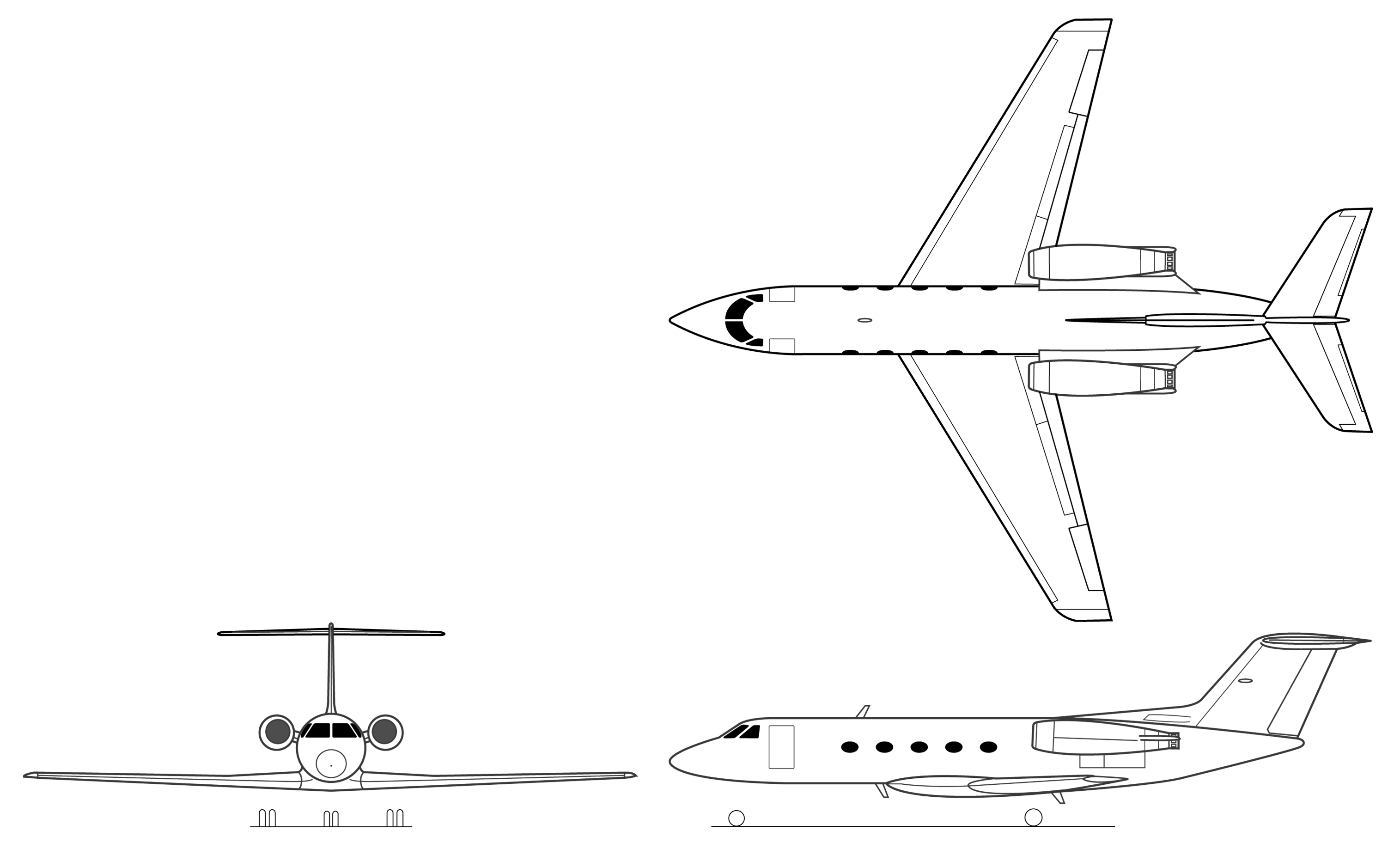

Data from Jane's All the World's Aircraft 1984-85

General characteristics

- Crew: 2
- Capacity: 19 (maximum certified) / 2,900 lb (1,315 kg) maximum payload
- Length: 79 ft 11 in (24.36 m)
- Wingspan: 77 ft 10 in (23.72 m)
- Height: 24 ft 6 in (7.47 m)
- Wing area: 934.6 sq ft (86.83 m^{2})
- Airfoil: stn.50: NACA 0012 modified; stn 145: NACA 63A-009.5; stn 385: NACA 64 series modified
- Empty weight: 39,100 lb (17,735 kg) (basic operating weight)
- Maximum zero-fuel weight: 42,000 lb (19,051 kg)
- Gross weight: 65,500 lb (29,710 kg)
- Max takeoff weight: 68,200 lb (30,935 kg)
- Maximum landing weight: 58,500 lb (26,535 kg)
- Fuel capacity: 28,300 lb (12,837 kg) maximum
- Powerplant: 2 × Rolls-Royce Spey 511-8 turbofan engines, 11,400 lbf (51 kN) thrust each

Performance

- Stall speed: 105 kn (121 mph, 194 km/h) at MLW, flaps down
- Maximum cruising Mach number: M0.85 at max power at 30,000 ft (9,144 m) and AUW of 55,000 lb (24,948 kg)
- Maximum Mach speed: M0.85
- Economical cruise speed: M0.77
- Range: 3,550 nmi (4,090 mi, 6,570 km) with 8 passengers, NBAA IFR reserves, crew of 3, 2,000 lb (900 kg) / pax

3,970 nmi (4,569 mi; 7,352 km) with NBAA VFR reserves

- Service ceiling: 45,000 ft (14,000 m)
- Rate of climb: 3,800 ft/min (19 m/s)

1,200 ft/min (6.10 m/s) on one engine

- Take-off run (FAA): 5,850 ft (1,783 m)
- Landing run (FAA): 3,400 ft (1,036 m)
- Operational Noise levels (FAR Pt.36)

- Take-off: 91 EPNdB
- Approach: 97 EPNdB
- Sideline: 103 EPNdB

== See also ==
Related development

- Grumman Gulfstream I
- Gulfstream III
- Shuttle Training Aircraft
