= Small Aircraft Transportation System =

The Small Aircraft Transportation System (SATS) was a joint research project between the Federal Aviation Administration (FAA) and the National Aeronautics and Space Administration (NASA), along with local airports and aviation authorities. SATS intended to facilitate transportation between small General Aviation airports, using small aircraft as an alternative to traditional airline travel. The project explored the technical, business case, regulatory framework, and legal aspects of the proposed system. See Bassel F El-Kasaby, Scott E Tarry, Karisa K Vlasek, Aviation insurance and the implementation of the small aircraft transportation system, Journal of Air Transport Management, Volume 9, Issue 5, 2003, Pages 299-308, ISSN 0969-6997.

== Conception ==
The terrorist attacks of September 11th caused the Transportation Security Administration (TSA) to increase security measures. These increases in security multiplied the amount of time travelers spent getting through the airport to their gate. After the tourism industry rebounded from the recession caused by the attacks, the higher levels of airport traffic further demonstrated the strain on these new elevated security procedures.

NASA and the FAA saw in General Aviation the cure to the aviation industry's problems. With more than 3,400 small airports in the U.S. alone, a large amount of traffic could be diverted from mass transit airline travel to private, small aircraft General Aviation.

The idea was born with the introduction of new technologies by NASA and the development of logistics, systems, and infrastructure by the FAA.

The concept of the Small Aircraft Transportation System (SATS) first emerged in the late 1980s during a workshop by the AIAA, NASA, FAA, and industry titled, "The Role of Technology in Revitalizing the U.S. General Aviation Industry." The SATS concept was first articulated by that name in the 1997 presentation by NASA at the Oshkosh Air Venture Convention, "Life After Airliners." The SATS concept emerged from the work of the Advanced General Aviation Transport Experiments (AGATE) Alliance. The AGATE Alliance was a public-private partnership (1994-2001), established by NASA, between government and industry to revitalize the technology deployment capacity for the U.S. General Aviation industry. Based on the technology design guidelines, system standards, and certification standards developed by AGATE, a new generation of personal transportation aircraft was developed by industry from around the world. These new aircraft appear to be economically and operationally viable for use in on-demand transportation fleet operations. The first fleet operators began services in 2005, with increasing numbers of companies starting operations in 2006 and 2007.

== Proposed technology ==
The greatest barriers were perceived to be a poor safety record for small aircraft operating from general aviation airports, restricted airspace capacity, and weather-related complications to the expanded use of small aircraft and community airports for public transportation.

The SATS Project (2001-2006), conducted by NASA and partners in the National Consortium for Aviation Mobility (NCAM), demonstrated the technical capabilities' viability in the following four areas:

- High-volume operations at airports without control towers or terminal radar facilities
- Technologies enabling safe landings at more airports in almost all weather conditions
- Integration of SATS aircraft into a higher capacity air traffic control system, with complex flows and slower aircraft
- Improved single-pilot ability to function competently in evolving, complex national airspace

== See also ==
- Air taxi
- Very light jet
- Compressed air car
