= Systems Integration Evaluation Remote Research Aircraft =

NASA research UAV

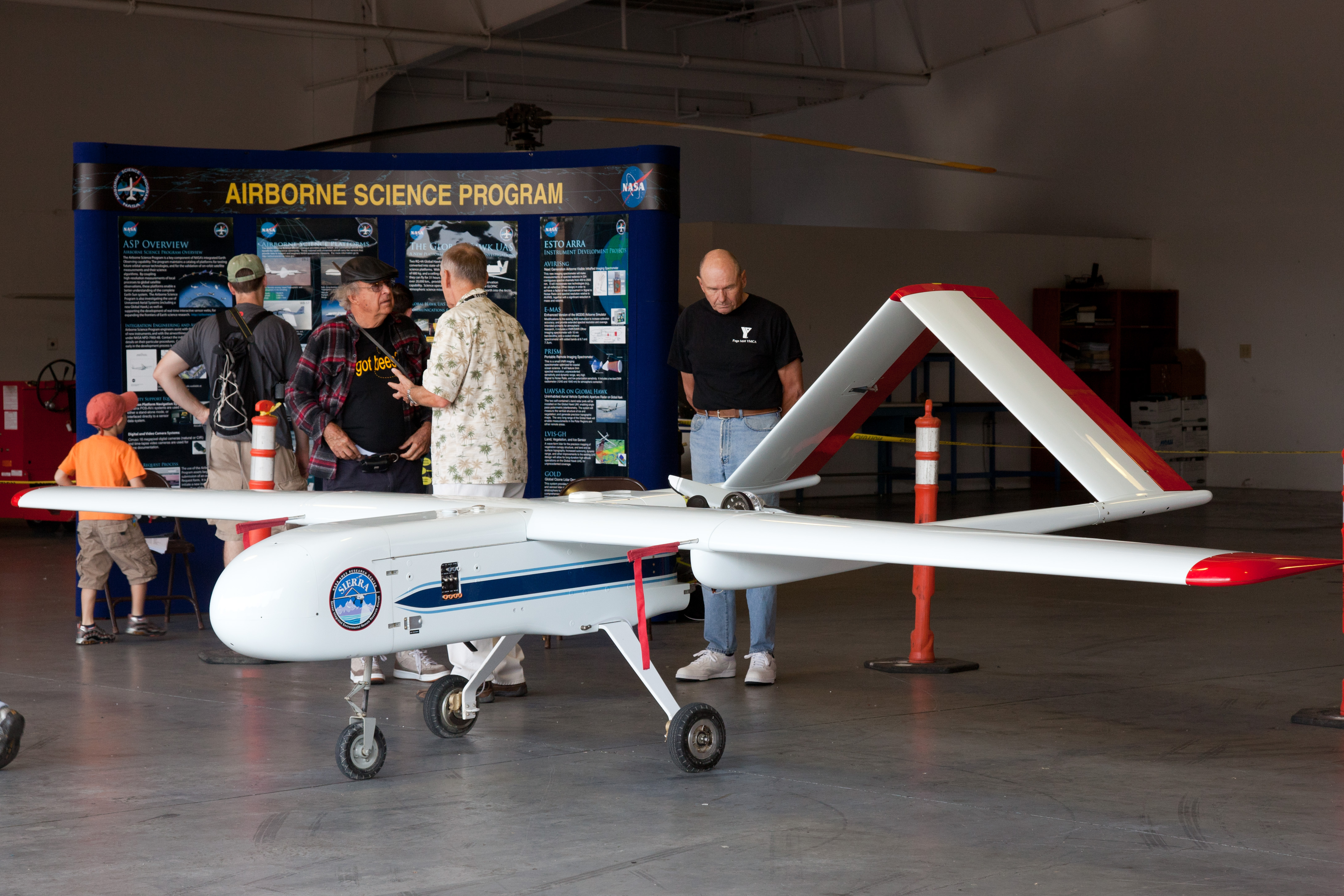
- SIERRA being displayed at a public event

General information
- Type: Research, Unmanned aerial vehicle
- National origin: United States
- Manufacturer: U.S. Naval Research Laboratory and developed at NASA's Ames Research Center
- Primary user: NASA

History
- Introduction date: 2009

The Systems Integration Evaluation Remote Research Aircraft (SIERRA) is a UAV designed by the U.S. Naval Research Laboratory and developed at NASA's Ames Research Center.

== Specifications ==
General characteristics

- Crew: 0
- Length: 11 ft 10 in (3.6 m)
- Wingspan: 20 ft 0 in (6.1 m)
- Height: 4 ft 7 in (1.4 m)
- Gross weight: 445 lb (202 kg)

Performance

- Maximum speed: 92 mph (148 km/h, 80 kn)
- Range: 600 mi (966 km, 520 nmi)
- Endurance: 10 hours
- Service ceiling: 12,000 ft (3,658 m)

== See also ==
- Unmanned Aerial Vehicle
