= Gulfstream III =

Family of executive jets

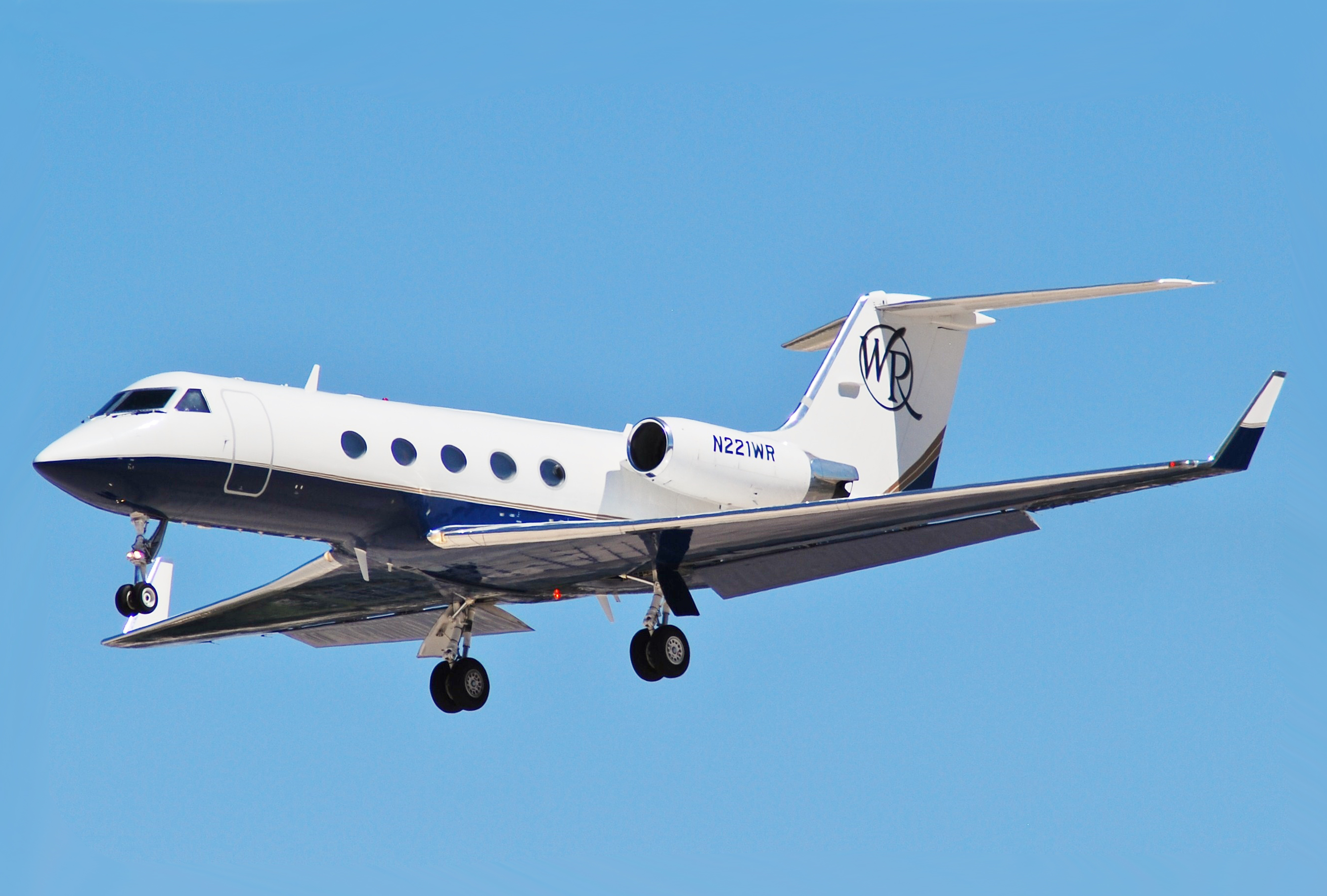
- Gulfstream III on approach

General information
- Type: Business jet
- Manufacturer: Gulfstream Aerospace
- Primary users: United States Gabon; India; Italy
- Number built: 206

History
- Manufactured: 1979–1986
- Introduction date: 1980
- First flight: 2 December 1979
- Developed from: Grumman Gulfstream II
- Developed into: Gulfstream IV/G400/G450

The Gulfstream III, a business jet produced by Gulfstream Aerospace, is an improved development of the Grumman Gulfstream II.

The U.S. military uses versions of the Gulfstream III as the C-20A/B/C/D/E aircraft, though later C-20 F/G/H/J are Gulfstream IV.

== Design and development ==
The Gulfstream III was built at Savannah, Georgia, in the United States and was designed as an improved variant of the Grumman Gulfstream II. Design studies were performed by Grumman Aerospace Corporation in collaboration with Gulfstream American Corporation. Design of the Gulfstream III started with an effort to synthesize a completely new wing employing NASA supercritical airfoil sections and winglets. Optimization studies considering weight, drag, fuel volume, cost, and performance indicated that a substantial portion of the new wing benefit could be secured with modifications to the existing wing. As a result, the new wing concept was canceled and work began on design modifications that would retain the Gulfstream II wing box structure and trailing edge surfaces.

Compared to the G-1159 Gulfstream II, the wing has 6 ft (1.8 m) more span and 5 ft (1.5 m) winglets added, the leading edge is longer and its contour is modified. The fuselage is 2 ft (61 cm) longer aft of the main door, the radome is extended and there is a new curved windshield. Maximum takeoff weight is increased to 68,200 lb (30,935 kg) or 69,700 lb (31,615 kg) and there are various changes to the autopilot, flight instruments, and engine instruments. The aircraft received its type certificate from the American Federal Aviation Administration on 22 September 1980. A total of 202 Gulfstream IIIs were built, with the last example built in 1986.

In 2013, the FAA modified 14 CFR part 91 rules to prohibit the operation of jets weighing 75,000 pounds or less that are not stage 3 noise compliant after December 31, 2015. The Gulfstream III is listed explicitly in Federal Register 78 FR 39576. Any Gulfstream IIIs that have not been modified by installing Stage 3 noise compliant engines or have not had "hushkits" installed for non-compliant engines will not be permitted to fly in the contiguous 48 states after December 31, 2015. 14 CFR §91.883 Special flight authorizations for jet airplanes weighing 75,000 pounds or less – lists special flight authorizations that may be granted for operation after December 31, 2015.

By 2018, prices for a used 1982 Gulfstream III started at $695,000.

== Variants ==
=== Civil variants ===
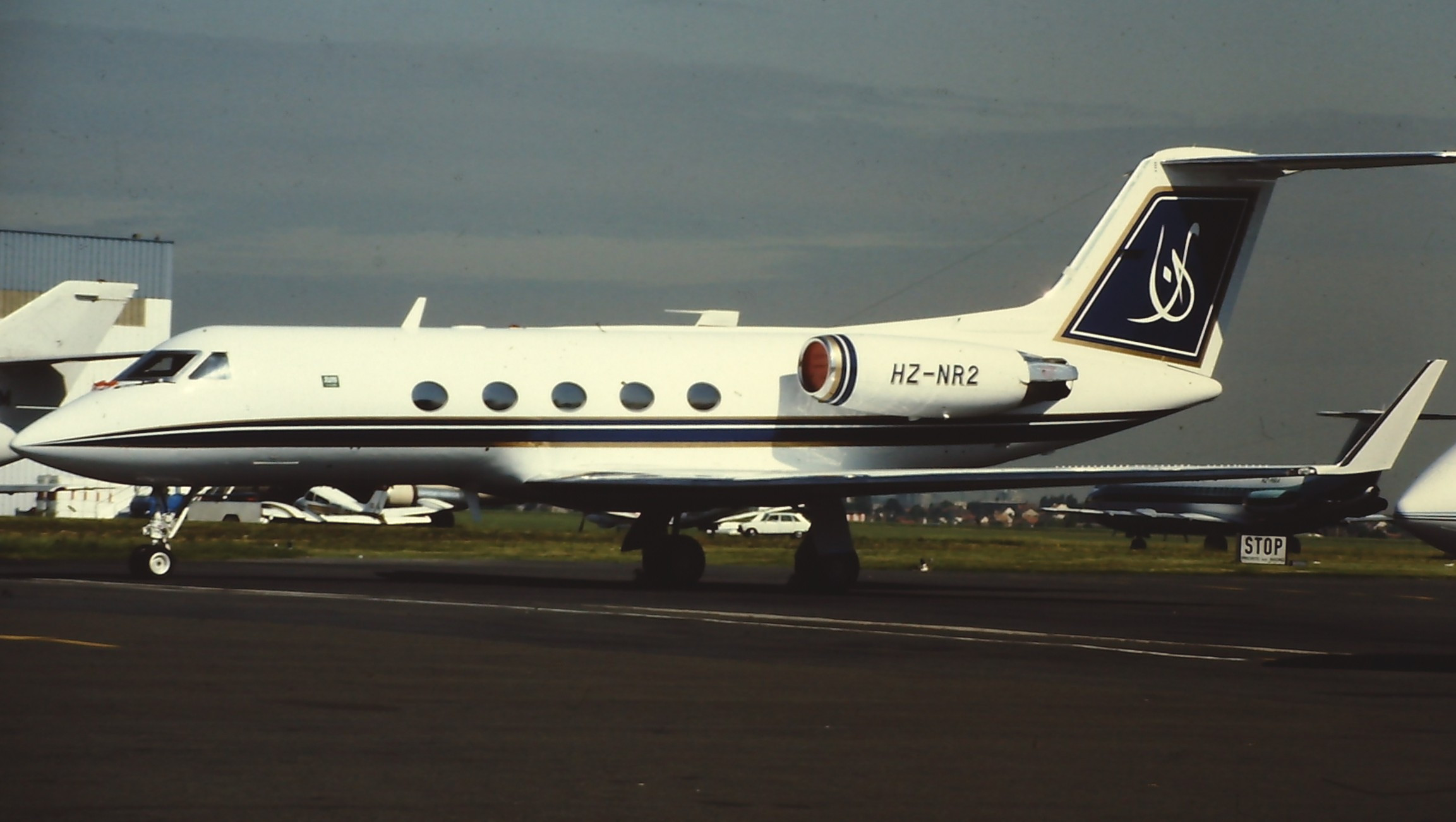
Gulfstream III in 1981

- Model G-1159A Gulfstream III - Two or three-crew executive, corporate transport aircraft, powered by two Rolls-Royce Spey turbofan engines.

=== Military variants ===
- C-20A - United States Air Force variant configured for 14 passengers and five crew; phased out of USAF service in 2002, one example transferred to NASA for use at the Neil A. Armstrong Flight Research Center at Edwards Air Force Base as a test aircraft.
- C-20B - United States Air Force and United States Coast Guard variant with upgraded electronics, used for Special Air Missions (SAM); the single Coast Guard C-20B was used by the Commandant of the Coast Guard and other senior USCG officials as well as the Secretary of Homeland Security.
- C-20C - United States Air Force C-20B with upgraded and "hardened" secure communications, often utilized as backup aircraft accompanying the VC-25A aircraft when it is operating as Air Force One
- C-20D - United States Navy Operational Support Airlift (OSA) aircraft with modified communications equipment for use by the Navy, normally in support of high-ranking naval officials
- C-20E - Stretched fuselage/redesigned wing variant for use by the United States Army as an Operational Support Airlift (OSA) aircraft
- Gulfstream III SRA-1 - Special reconnaissance and surveillance version for export.
- Gulfstream III SMA-3 - Export model for Denmark, fitted with a Texas Instruments APS-127 search radar. Three maritime reconnaissance and patrol, fisheries protection, search and rescue, and VIP transport aircraft were built for the Royal Danish Air Force in 1983. No longer in service.

NOTE: United States Army C-20F and C-20J, United States Navy/United States Marine Corps C-20G, and United States Air Force C-20H aircraft are all Gulfstream IV variants

== Special mission variants ==
A NASA Gulfstream C-20A (83-0502 cn 389) has been fitted with a centerline pylon to allow it to carry the Unmanned Aerial Vehicle Synthetic Aperture Radar (UAVSAR) pod.

A NASA Gulfstream III (N992NA cn 309) has also been fitted with a centerline pylon to allow it to carry the Airborne Microwave Observatory of Subcanopy and Subsurface (AirMOSS) pod, a modification of the UAVSAR pod.

The Phoenix Air Group operates two former Royal Danish Air Force SMA-3 aircraft (N173PA cn 313, N163PA cn 249) and a Gulfstream III (N186PA cn 317). One aircraft provides airborne maritime range surveillance for the Missile Defense Agency (MDA) and other Department of Defense range facilities using a high definition Texas Instruments APS-127 Surface Search Radar system. All three are configured with a large cargo door. In 2008 Phoenix Air developed an Airborne Biomedical Containment System with the CDC. In 2014, the system was deployed during the Ebola virus epidemic in Liberia to fly 12 ebola missions to the United States.

N30LX (cn 438) has been modified by the addition of a ventral canoe and sensor turret as the "Dragon Star" Airborne Multi-Intelligence Laboratory for use by Lockheed Martin. This has been leased by Italy since 2012.

Calspan operates N710CF (cn 448), which has been modified as an airborne test bed. Modifications include a centerline pylon and a dorsal satcom radome

Two Gulfstream IIIs, K2961 (cn 494) and K2962 (cn 495), equipped with long-range oblique photography cameras mounted in the fuselage, were delivered to the Indian Air Force.

== Operators ==
=== Military and government operators ===
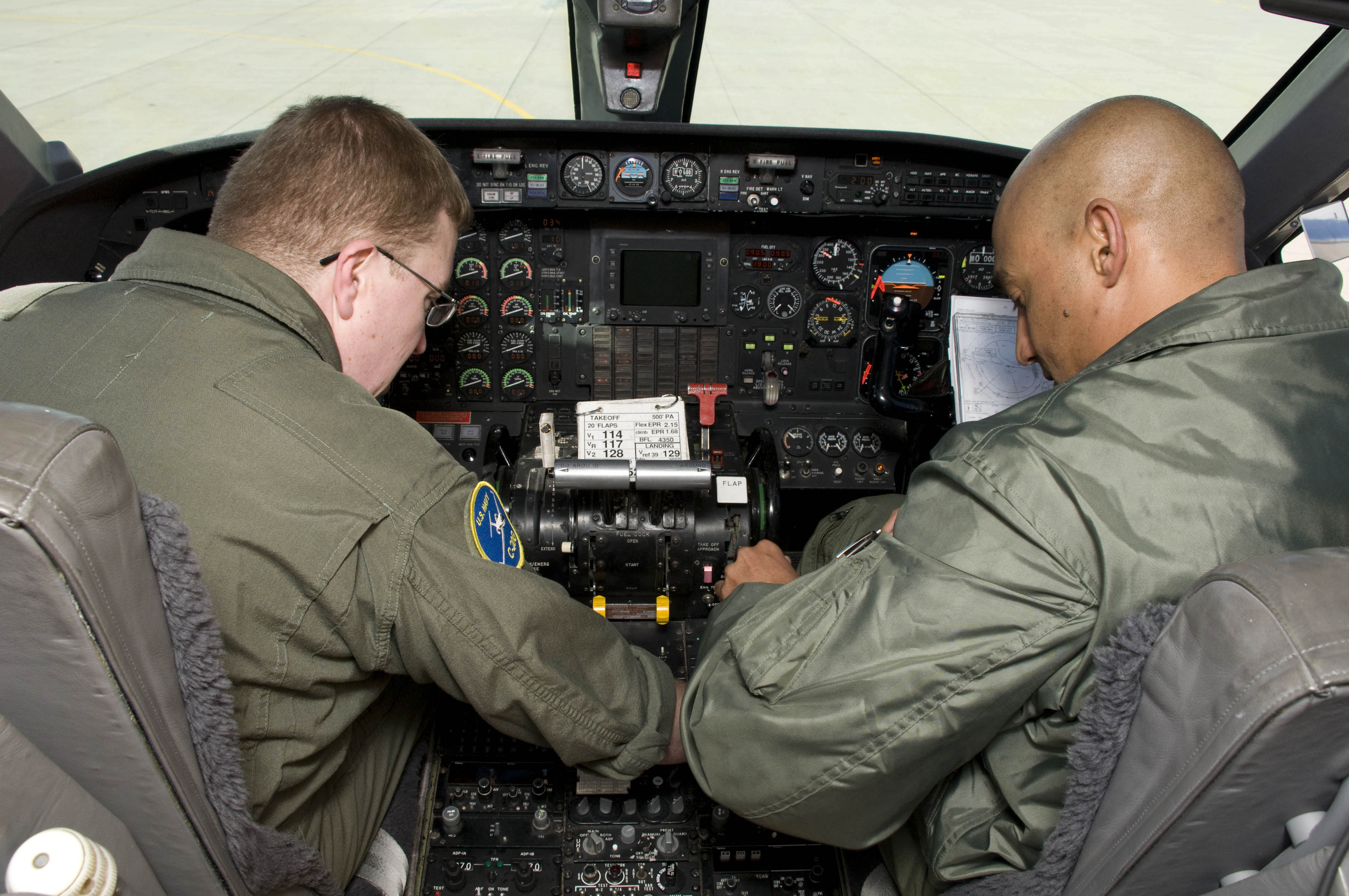
Cockpit of a C-20A

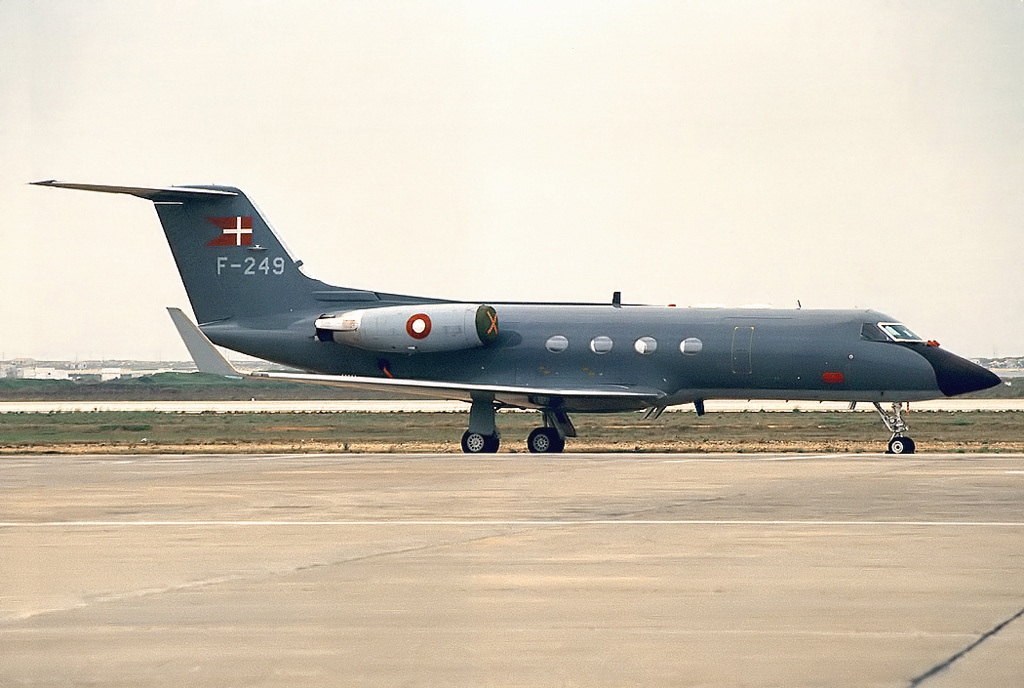
Danish Air Force Gulfstream III

Military and government operators of the Gulfstream III and C-20 include:

Algeria
Cameroon

- Cameroon Air Force (phased out)

Denmark

- Royal Danish Air Force

Gabon
Ghana

- Ghana Air Force

India

- Indian Air Force

Ireland

- Irish Air Corps - leased aircraft

Italy

- Italian Air Force operated two Gulfstream III from 1985 until 2003.

Ivory Coast

- Ivory Coast Air Force

Mexico

- Mexican Air Force - (former operator)

Morocco

- Royal Moroccan Air Force

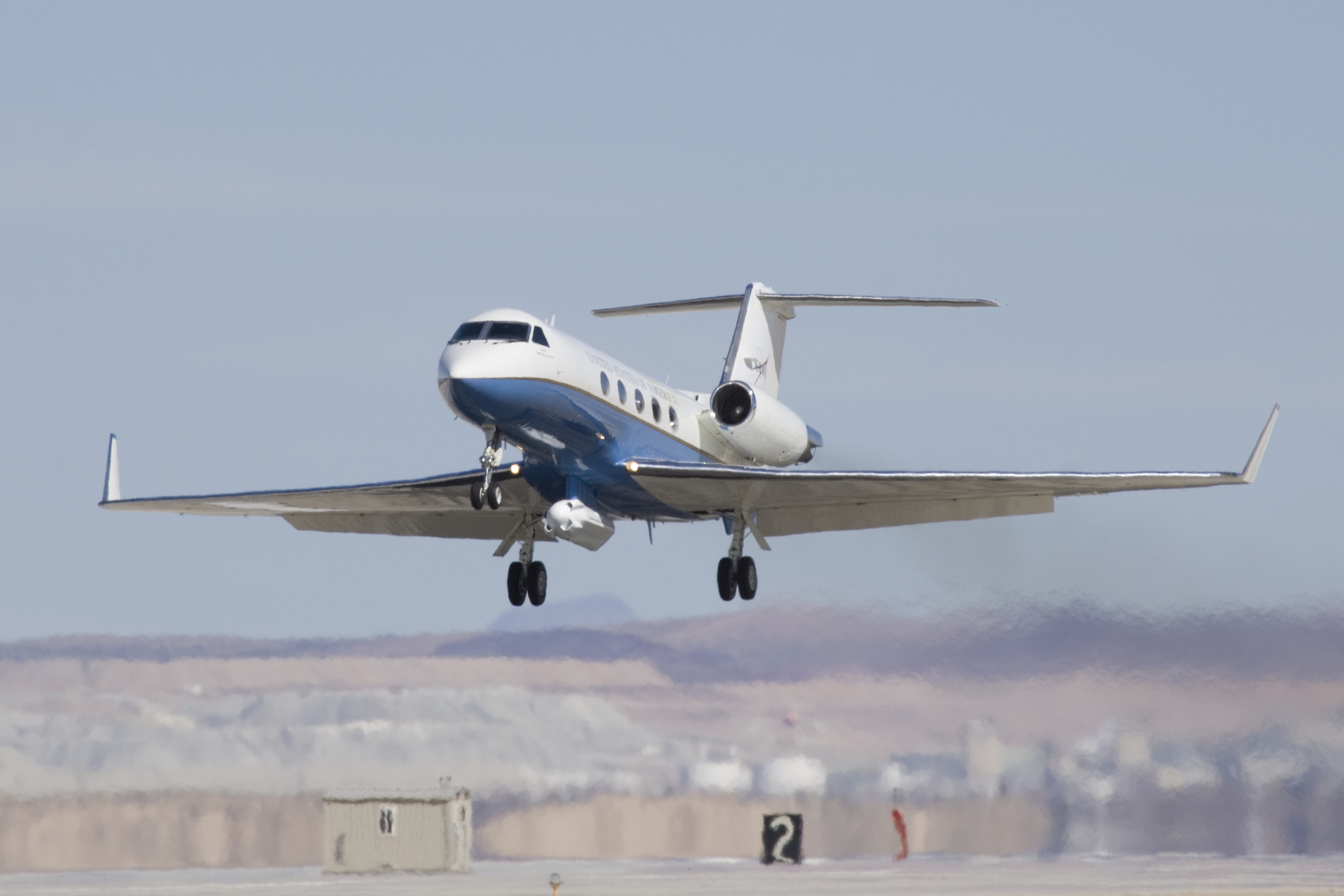
NASA's Gulfstream landing at Edwards Air Force Base

Oman
Saudi Arabia
Togo
Uganda

- Ugandan Air Force

United States

- United States Air Force
- United States Navy
- United States Army
- United States Coast Guard
- National Aeronautics and Space Administration

Venezuela

- Venezuelan Air Force

Zimbabwe

- Air Force of Zimbabwe - No. 3 Squadron (former operator)

== Accidents and incidents ==
- August 3, 1996 - Flew into mountain during final approach to Vagar Airport on Faroe Islands. The Gulfstream III (F-330) from RDAF - Royal Danish Air Force was destroyed killing all nine people on board, including the Danish Chief of Defence Jørgen Garde.
- March 29, 2001 - While trying to land at Aspen-Pitkin County Airport, an Avjet Gulfstream III crashed into a hill, killing all 18 people on board.
- July 4, 2017 - On the outskirts of Margarita Island, a Gulfstream III YV2896 of the Venezuelan Vice-President crashed into the sea with nine people on board. Two bodies were later recovered, with the remaining seven occupants believed to have been killed.

== Specifications (Gulfstream III) ==
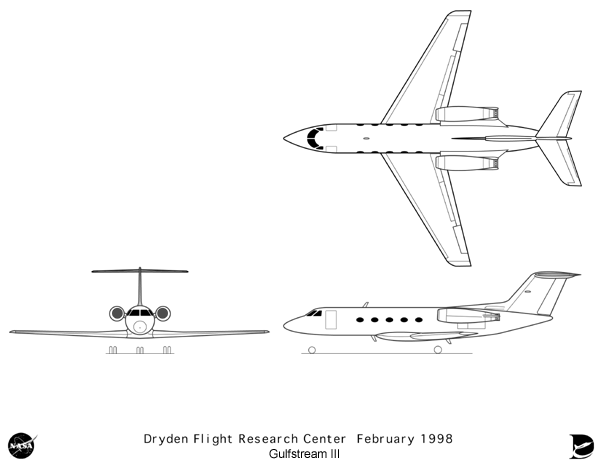

Data from Jane's Civil and Military Aircraft Upgrades 1994–95

General characteristics

- Crew: 2 pilots
- Capacity: 19 passengers (standard seating)
- Length: 83 ft 1 in (25.32 m)
- Wingspan: 77 ft 10 in (23.72 m)
- Height: 24 ft 4.5 in (7.430 m)
- Wing area: 934.6 sq ft (86.83 m^{2})
- Aspect ratio: 6:1
- Airfoil: root: NACA 0012 Mod.; tip: NACA 64A008.5
- Empty weight: 38,000 lb (17,237 kg)
- Max takeoff weight: 69,700 lb (31,615 kg)
- Powerplant: 2 × Rolls-Royce Spey RB.163 Mk 511-8 turbofan engines, 11,400 lbf (51 kN) thrust each

Performance

- Maximum speed: 501 kn (577 mph, 928 km/h) (max cruise)
- Cruise speed: 442 kn (509 mph, 819 km/h) (long range cruise)
- Stall speed: 105 kn (121 mph, 194 km/h)
- Range: 3,650 nmi (4,200 mi, 6,760 km) (eight passengers, IFR reserves)
- Service ceiling: 45,000 ft (14,000 m)
- Rate of climb: 3,800 ft/min (19 m/s)

== See also ==
Related development

- Grumman Gulfstream II
- Gulfstream IV/G400/G450

Related lists

- List of active United States military aircraft
