= Kenneth H. Dahlberg =

American World War II flying ace and businessman (1917–2011)

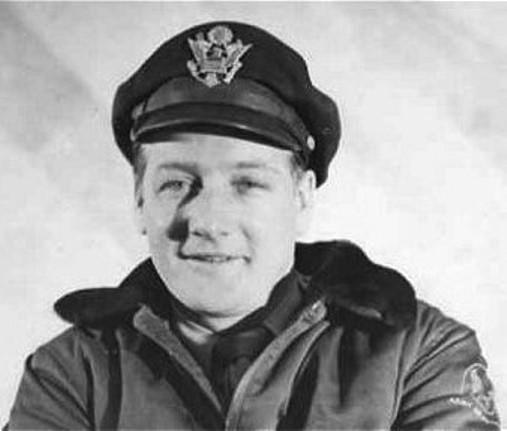
- Captain Dahlberg
- Born: Kenneth Harry Dahlberg; June 30, 1917; Saint Paul, Minnesota, U.S.
- Died: October 4, 2011 (aged 94); Deephaven, Minnesota, U.S.
- Burial place: Arlington National Cemetery
- Occupation: Businessman
- Political party: Republican
- Spouse: Betty Jayne Segerstrom (m. 1947)
- Children: 3
- Military career
- Allegiance: United States
- Branch: United States Army Air Forces; Minnesota Air National Guard
- Service years: 1941–1951
- Rank: Major
- Unit: 354th Fighter Group
- Conflicts: World War II
- Awards: Distinguished Service Cross; Silver Star; Distinguished Flying Cross (2); Purple Heart (2); Air Medal (16)

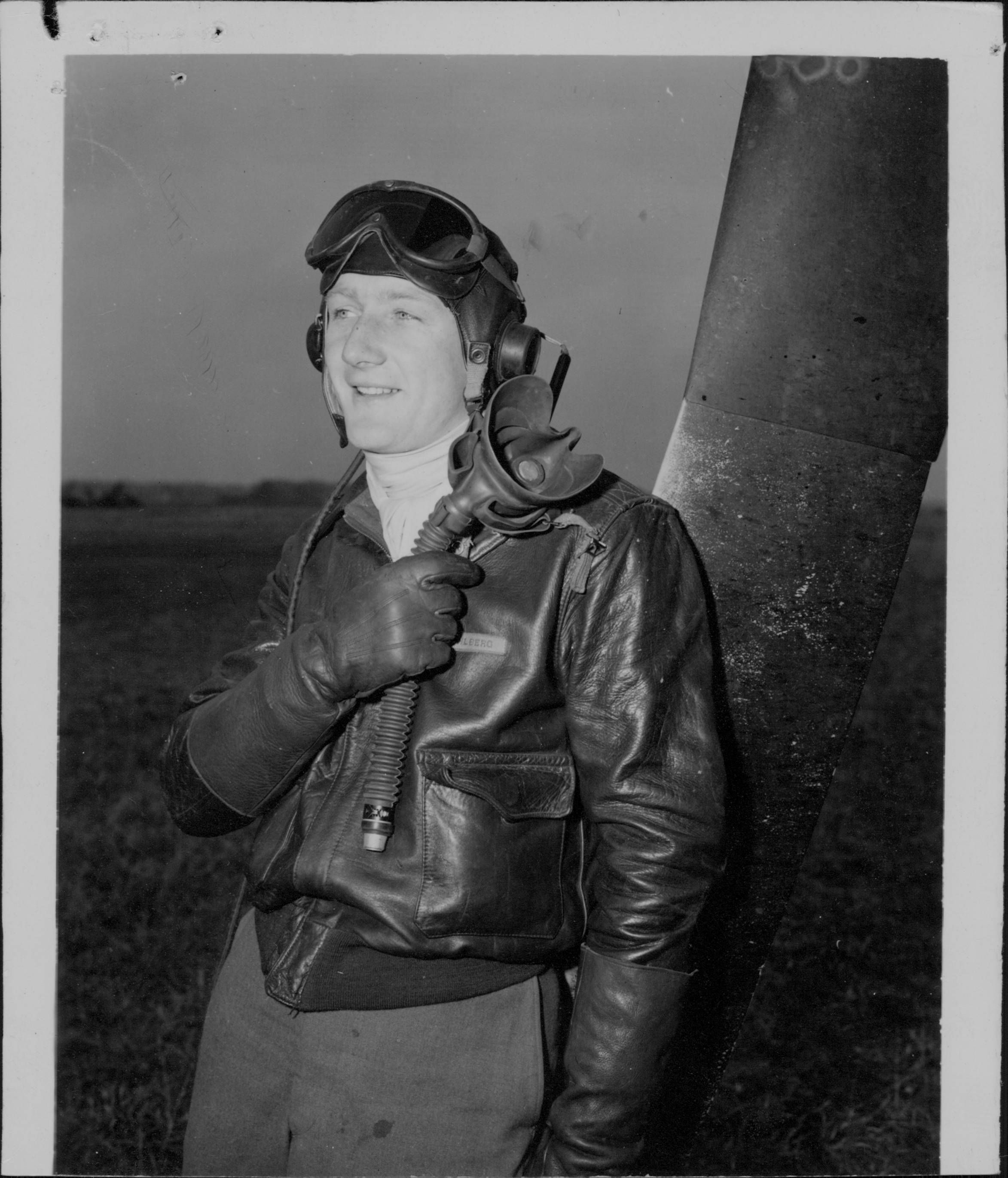
Lieutenant Dahlberg (1944)

Kenneth Harry Dahlberg (June 30, 1917 – October 4, 2011) was an American businessman and highly decorated World War II fighter ace. According to reporter Bob Woodward, a check made out to Dahlberg was a key part in connecting the Watergate scandal to President Richard Nixon's re-election campaign, though Dahlberg himself was not accused of any wrongdoing.

== Early life ==
Born in Saint Paul, Minnesota, Dahlberg grew up on a farm near the village of Wilson, Wisconsin and attended classes in a one-room school for 11 years. During his senior year, he moved back to Saint Paul to live with an aunt in order to graduate from an accredited high school, Harding High School.

After graduation in 1935, he worked in the hotel business, starting as a dishwasher and working his way up to food and beverage manager for a hotel chain.

== World War II ==
Dahlberg was drafted into the United States Army in 1941. He eventually became an aviation cadet in the United States Army Air Forces (USAAF), where one of his instructors was future Senator Barry Goldwater.

After training, Dahlberg flew the P-47 Thunderbolt and P-51 Mustang fighters with the USAAF 353rd Fighter Squadron, 354th Fighter Group, Ninth Air Force, in Europe. An ace, he was credited with 15 aerial victories.

He was shot down three times. The first time, he bailed out near Paris and was sheltered by the French Resistance. Disguised as a woman, he rode a bicycle to Allied lines 40 miles (64 km) away.

He received numerous awards and decorations, including the Distinguished Service Cross for leading a flight of 16 Thunderbolts of the 354th Fighter Group against an attack of 70 German Messerschmitt Bf 109 fighters on December 19, 1944, during the Battle of the Bulge. Dahlberg accounted for four enemy planes that day, but was himself shot down. He was rescued by Martin Dardis and four other American soldiers. Many years after the war, both Dardis and Dahlberg became key figures in the Watergate scandal.

On February 14, 1945, Dahlberg was downed for the third and final time, near Bitburg, and became a prisoner of war for the final three months of the war.

Continuing his military service after the war, Dahlberg served with the Minnesota Air National Guard until 1951.

== Business career ==
Dahlberg went to work for Telex, a company that made hearing aids. In 1948, he founded Dahlberg Electronics, a subsidiary of which is the Miracle-Ear hearing aids manufacturer. By 1959, Miracle-Ear had evolved into a subsidiary of Dahlberg, Inc., with $100 million in annual revenue. A national advertising campaign that Dahlberg, Inc. ran from 1988 until mid-1993 was subject to charges of false advertising by the Federal Trade Commission, which were settled in 1995 when the company agreed to pay a $2.75 million civil penalty. In the summer of 1993, Dahlberg sold his company to Bausch & Lomb for $139 million.

In 1995, Dahlberg started the venture capital firm Carefree Capital, whose investments include the Buffalo Wild Wings restaurant chain. As of 2010, Dahlberg lived in Carefree, Arizona, and still piloted a Cessna Citation jet.

== Watergate ==
During the Watergate investigation by Washington Post reporters Bob Woodward and Carl Bernstein, chronicled in All the President's Men, Bernstein traveled to Miami to see Martin Dardis, the head investigator for Dade County District Attorney Richard Gerstein. Since most of the Watergate burglars were from Miami, the district attorney's office had launched an investigation. Dardis showed Bernstein a photostatic copy of a cashier's check for $25,000 that had been deposited into the bank account of a real estate firm owned by Bernard Barker, one of the Watergate burglars. The check was drawn on a Boca Raton, Florida, bank and was made out to Kenneth H. Dahlberg. Bernstein telephoned this information to Woodward, who was back at The Washington Post in Washington, D.C.

Woodward telephoned Dahlberg at home. At first, Dahlberg did not believe he was actually a reporter. He later called Woodward back and explained that his neighbor, Virginia Piper, had been recently kidnapped, and it was an upsetting experience. Dahlberg told Woodward he had the check made out to himself while he was in Florida on business and did not want to carry that much cash around. Dahlberg could not explain how the check got into Barker's bank account, but said it was given to either the Committee for the Re-Election of the President or Maurice Stans.

Dahlberg was the Midwest finance chairman for the Committee to Re-elect the President during President Richard M. Nixon's 1972 campaign. In 1968, he was the finance chairman for Clark MacGregor's unsuccessful Senate campaign in Minnesota. MacGregor was later appointed the head of the Committee to Re-elect the President in 1972, after former attorney general John Mitchell had resigned.

It was later learned that the $25,000 came from Dwayne Andreas, chief executive officer of Archer Daniels Midland, as an anonymous donation to the Nixon campaign. Woodward has said that finding Dahlberg's check was a turning point in their investigation because it led to the discovery of how the Watergate burglars were financed through a money laundering scheme.

Dahlberg was never charged with any wrongdoing in the Watergate scandal.

== Death ==
Dahlberg died on October 4, 2011, at his Deephaven, Minnesota home. He was survived by his wife of 64 years, Betty Jayne (née Segerstrom), two daughters, and a son. He was buried at Arlington National Cemetery.

== Honors ==
In 1967, Dahlberg was notified by the Department of Defense that he had earned the Distinguished Service Cross in 1945, but it had not been presented to him at that time because he was a prisoner of war. Dahlberg also earned the Silver Star, two Distinguished Flying Crosses, two Purple Hearts, 16 Air Medals, and the French Croix de Guerre.

In 1970, President Richard Nixon appointed Dahlberg to the board of visitors of the United States Air Force Academy. He also served as a trustee of Hamline University.

In 1996, Dahlberg was inducted into the Scandinavian-American Hall of Fame at the Norsk Høstfest in Minot, North Dakota. He was inducted into the Minnesota Aviation Hall of Fame in 1997 and the Arizona Aviation Hall of Fame in 2009.

In July 2007, he was featured in the aviation series Dogfights on The History Channel, in the final segment of the episode on the P-47 Thunderbolt.

In 2012, the Kenneth H. Dahlberg Memorial to Service was built and constructed at Hamline University, where Dahlberg served as a life trustee and played an integral part in its construction.

Dahlberg was a trustee and longtime supporter of the Museum of Flight in Seattle, which named its military aviation history research center for him.

== Aerial victory credits ==
Chronicle of aerial victories
| Date | # | Type | Location | Aircraft flown | Unit Assigned |
|---|---|---|---|---|---|
| June 22, 1944 | 1 | Messerschmitt Bf 109 | Rambouillet, France | P-51B Mustang | 353 FS, 354 FG |
| June 29, 1944 | 1 | Bf 109 | Berrière, France | P-51B | 353 FS, 354 FG |
| August 16, 1944 | 3 | Focke-Wulf Fw 190 | Maintenon, France | P-51B | 353 FS, 354 FG |
| September 12, 1944 | 4 | Fw 190 | Frankfurt, Germany | P-51B | 353 FS, 354 FG |
| December 1, 1944 | 2 | Bf 109 | Karlsruhe, Germany | P-51D Mustang | 353 FS, 354 FG |
| December 19, 1944 | 4 | Bf 109 | Trier, Germany | P-47D Thunderbolt | 353 FS, 354 FG |

SOURCES: Air Force Historical Study 85: USAF Credits for the Destruction of Enemy Aircraft, World War II

== Military awards ==
| Distinguished Service Cross |
| Silver Star |
| Distinguished Flying Cross with bronze oak leaf cluster |
| Purple Heart with bronze oak leaf cluster |
| Air Medal with three silver oak leaf clusters |
| Presidential Unit Citation |
| Prisoner of War Medal |
| American Defense Service Medal |
| American Campaign Medal |
| European-African-Middle Eastern Campaign Medal with three campaign stars |
| World War II Victory Medal |

| Air Force Longevity Service Award |

Croix de Guerre with Palm (France)

=== Distinguished Service Cross citation ===
Dahlberg, Kenneth
Captain, U.S Army Air Corps
353rd Fighter Squadron, 354th Fighter Group, 9th Air Force
Date of Action: December 19, 1944
Headquarters, U.S. Strategic Forces in Europe: General Orders No. 55 (1945)
Citation:

The President of the United States of America, authorized by Act of Congress, July 9, 1918, takes pleasure in presenting the Distinguished Service Cross to Captain (Air Corps) Kenneth H. Dahlberg, United States Army Air Forces, for extraordinary heroism in connection with military operations against an armed enemy while serving as Pilot of a P-47 Fighter Airplane in the 353d Fighter Squadron, 354th Fighter Group, NINTH Air Force, in aerial combat against enemy forces on 19 December 1944, over Germany. On that date, Captain Dahlberg was serving as flight commander during an armed reconnaissance mission near Trier, Germany, when a formation of more than ninety enemy fighters was observed. Despite the enemy's vast numerical superiority, Captain Dahlberg led his eight-ship flight in a direct attack upon the hostile force. Although his wingman was forced to break combat, Captain Dahlberg relentlessly attacked the enemy, destroying four of their aircraft and damaging another. The extraordinary heroism and determination of this officer to destroy the enemy are in keeping with the highest traditions of the military service and reflect great credit upon himself, the 9th Air Force, and the United States Army Air Forces.
