= Richard Gerstein =

American lawyer (1923–1992)

State Attorney for Miami-Dade County, Florida
- In office 1956–1978
- Succeeded by: Janet Reno

Personal details
- Born: Richard Everett Gerstein; September 5, 1923 Pittsburgh, Pennsylvania, U.S.
- Died: April 26, 1992 (aged 68) Miami, Florida, U.S.
- Party: Democratic
- Education: University of Miami (BBA and LLB)

Richard E. Gerstein (September 5, 1923, Pittsburgh, Pennsylvania – April 26, 1992, Miami, Florida) was an American lawyer and six-term State Attorney for Miami-Dade County. He obtained the first conviction in the Watergate scandal, of Watergate burglar Bernard Barker, and uncovered the first connections between the botched burglary and President Richard Nixon's reelection campaign.

== Early life ==
Gerstein was born in Pittsburgh, Pennsylvania, in 1923. He graduated from the University of Miami with a Bachelor of Business Administration in 1947 and a Bachelor of Laws in 1949 and practiced law.

== World War II ==
He served as a United States Army Air Forces navigator. During a bombing raid over Germany, he lost his right eye. He was also awarded the Distinguished Flying Cross for guiding his crippled bomber back to England from a mission over Ludwigshaven, Germany.

== Public service ==
In 1956, he was elected to his first term as State Attorney for Dade County, at age 33 the youngest state attorney in Florida history and the first Jew elected to a countywide office in Florida.

In 1963, anti-semite Donald Branch was sentenced to 20 years imprisonment for bombing the home of Don Shoemaker, editor of the Miami Herald, and plotting to assassinate several Jewish Miami community leaders, among them Gerstein.

Gerstein launched a month-long inquiry into the controversial first Liston-Clay (Muhammad Ali) fight in Miami Beach in 1964, which found no evidence that the boxing match had been fixed; Sonny Liston had a sore shoulder during the fight that handicapped him.

That same year, he lost a high-profile case against incestuous lovers Candace Mossler and her nephew Melvin Powers, charged with murdering Mossler's millionaire husband.

During his 1968 reelection campaign, Gerstein was accused of taking a bribe by his Republican opponent, Shelby Highsmith, and the Miami Herald. However, the grand jury was not convinced; it indicted the alleged bribe giver and another accuser on the charge of perjury and also rebuked the Herald.

In the early morning hours of June 17, 1972, police arrested five burglars who had broken into the headquarters of the Democratic National Committee in the Watergate Office Building in Washington, DC, and wiretapped at least one telephone. Martin Dardis, Gerstein's chief investigator, was tipped off about a connection between a Miami bank and Bernard Barker, one of the burglars. A check for $25,000 had recently been deposited in Barker's account. Gerstein launched an investigation, suspecting the operation was based in Key Biscayne, a village in his county; the money linked the burglars to Nixon's reelection campaign.

In December 1977, partway through his sixth term, he resigned, effective January 20. He was succeeded by a former aide, Janet Reno.

== Post-public service ==
He became a partner in the law firm of Bailey, Gerstein, Rashkind & Dresnick.

In 1991, he represented Paul Reubens, who played Pee-wee Herman; Reubens pleaded no contest to charges of indecent exposure.

== Death ==
On April 26, 1992, the 68-year-old Gerstein suffered a fatal heart attack. He was taken to Miami Heart Institute, and was dead on arrival. By chance, Richard Nixon, the man Gerstein had helped to bring down, was brought to Miami Heart Institute the same night, for a sprained ankle.

== Honors ==
Gerstein received the Rockefeller Public Service Award in 1979.

In 1992, Miami's courthouse was renamed the Richard E. Gerstein Justice Building.
