= Arizona Aviation Hall of Fame =

Pima Air & Space Museum exhibit

- Established: 1985
- Location: Tucson, Arizona
- Website: pimaair.org

Arizona Aviation Hall of Fame (AAHOF) is located in the Pima Air & Space Museum, Tucson, Arizona. The Aviation Hall of Fame exhibit is located in the honored Dorothy Finley Space Gallery on the Museum grounds and features noteworthy Arizona aviators.

== History ==
AAHOF was established by a joint proclamation by the Governor of Arizona in 1985 that creates a process to induct its states notable and famous aviators into the Arizona Aviation Hall of Fame.

Arizona AHOF recognizes its aviation industry leaders, pioneers in hot air ballooning of the 19th century, high-tech aerospace engineers and entrepreneurs, where these people of today who are a vital role in advanced aircraft and missile technology.

== Hall of Fame Inductees ==
2026

- Jessica Cox
- Frank Schiel Jr.
- James K. Johnson

2014

- William S. Underwood
- Darrell Artwood Sawyer

2013

- Barbara McConnell Barrett
- Edward Raymond Beauvais
- Charles Eugene Mann

2012

- Lt. Col. Mark Berent, USAF (Ret)
- Ralph A. O'Neill
- Arthur Van Haren, Jr.

2011

- Edwin Jones Montgomery, Sr.
- Peter Hollingsworth Smith
- William Dillard "Billy" Walker

2010

- Barbara Lee Harper
- Maj. Gen. Donald L. Owens, AANG (Ret)
- Clifford M. Sterrenberg

2009

- Kenneth H. Dahlberg
- Major General Carl G. Schneider (Ret)
- Ruby Wine Sheldon

2008

- Graham A. 'Lum' Edwards
- Laurence E. Gesell
- Arvin C. Schultz
- Hewitt T. Wheless

2007

- Col. Fred Cone, USMC (Ret)
- Col. Roger Parrish, USAF (Ret)
- Elgin Newell
- Cheryl A. Stearns

2006

- Harold "Bud" Abrams
- Donald C. Downie
- Ralph S. Johnson
- James Vercellino

2005

- Joseph La Placa
- Roy O. McCaldin
- Hugh Stewart
- James Turnbow

2004

- Roy M. Coulliette
- Irene Leverton
- John Richard Gasho Sr.
- Douglas T. Nelson, USAF Major General, Ret

2003

- Ralph D. "Hoot" Gibson, USAF Col., Ret.
- Robert W. Waltz, USAF BGen., Ret. (1920–1995)
- Darrell Artwade Sawyer
- William S. Underwood, USAF Col., Ret.

2002

- Brig. Gen. Joseph (Joe) Foss, USMC (Ret.)
- Raymond L. (Ray) Haupt
- Martha Ann Wilkins Mitchell & Michael (Mike) Mitchell
- Gladys Mae Morrison

2001

- Major Frederick E. Ferguson, US Army (Ret)
- Gordon B. Hamilton
- Robert McCall
- Raymond Victor Schwanbeck

2000

- LTC David Althoff, USMC (Ret)
- Janet Harman Bragg
- John H. "Jack" Connelly & Leland Hayward
- Jack Womack

1999

- Roy Spangler Davis
- Ronald R. Fogleman
- Ruth Dailey Helm & Dawn R. B. Seymour
- Joan Fay Shankle & Clarence E. Shankle

1998

- David M. Jones
- Charles A. "Buck" Rowe
- Francis R. "Dick" Scobee
- Richard G. Snyder

1997

- Frank K. "Pete" Everest
- Sen. John S. McCain
- A. Lee Moore
- Patty Wagstaff

1996

- James R. Greenwood
- Anthony V. "Snag" Grossetta
- Samuel Harry Robertson
- William R. Sears

1995

- Gerald Brown
- William P. Cutter & William R. Cutter
- Joseph A. Moller
- R. Dixon Speas

1994

- Harry B. Combs
- John Clifford "Cliff" Garrett
- Lowell H. Smith
- Louise Timken

1993

- Col. Leon W. Gray
- Col. Vernon V. Haywood
- Alfred A. Hudgin
- Charles O. Miller

1992

- A. Howard Hasbrook
- Joseph C. Lincoln
- Charles W.
- Arthur Van Haren Jr.
- George Varga, Jr.

1991

- Ruth R. Reinhold
- George I. Steinke
- Ralph G. Vaughan
- Robert Woodhouse & Woodrow P. Jongeward

1990

- Col. Frank Borman
- Walter Douglas, Jr.
- Sen. Barry M. Goldwater
- Frank Luke, Jr.

== See also ==
- North American aviation halls of fame
