= Patrick Taulère =

American film director

Patrick Taulère is an American director, producer and writer for film television and advertising. He is sometimes credited as Patrick Taulere. He was born in Perpignan in the south of France and spent is childhood in Le Perthus, a village situated at the border of France and Spain. He studied at the university of La Sorbonne and Orsay in Paris, France. When he was 20, Taulere moved to Hollywood to study film and graduated from Art Center in Pasadena as an honored film major. He started his directing career at ABC and became American citizen in 1990.

== Filmography ==
FILMS

- Boudica, Warrior Queen (The History Channel)
- The Battle of Tripoli (The History Channel)
- The Plot to Kill Nixon (The History Channel)
- The Last Mission (The History Channel)
- Troy (The History Channel)
- Terminus (second unit director; AAA distribution)

SERIES

- Twisted Love (Discovery ID)
- A Lie to Die For (NBC-Universal/Oxygen)
- Twisted Sisters (Discovery ID)
- Ice Cold Killers (Discovery ID)
- Death By Gossip (Discovery ID)
- Limomasters (Fox/Nat Geo Mundo)
- Wicked Attraction (Discovery ID)
- Deadly Alibi (Bio)
- Prenup to Murder (Bio)
- 1000 Ways to Die (Spike)
- Arrest and Trial (Universal/Dick Wolf Films)
- Unsolved Mysteries (NBC/CBS/Lifetime)
- The Investigators (Trutv)
- The Scariest Places on Earth (Fox)
- Dominick Dunne's Power, Privilege, and Justice(Trutv)
- Guilty or Innocent (Discovery Channel)
- Critical Condition (TLC)
- What Should You Do? (Lifetime)
- Angels Among Us (CMT)
- Seconde B (France 2)
- Beyond Chance (Lifetime)
- It's a Miracle (PAX)
- Million Dollar Mysteries (Fox)
- Sightings (Paramount)
- Paranormal Bordeline (Paramount)
- Name Your Adventure (NBC)
- How Do They Do that? (CBS)
- Wide World of Kids (Syndication)
- Lifestyles of the Rich and Famous (Syndication)
- Rooms for Improvement (HGTV)

PILOTS

- Castaways in Paradise (Fine Living)
- Treasure Hunters(HGTV)
- The Enforcers (Lifetime)
- Destination Style (Travel Channel)
- Small Talk (NBC)
- Beach Patrol (LTC)

SPECIALS

- A Home For The Holidays (CBS)
- Night Shymalan's Signs of Fear (ABC)
- In The Mind of (TLC)
- Scandals Hollywood Style (MGM)
- World's Funniest Pets (CBS)
- America's Greatest Pets (UPN)
- The Secrets of Alien Abduction (Paramount)
- More secrets revealed (ABC)
- Newsweek Awards (NBC)
- Hollywood International (Syndication)
- Swimsuit Special (ABC)

INTERSTITIAL SERIES & PILOTS

- Saturday Night Solutions (Trutv)
- Movie Break (TBS)
- Movie & a Makeover (TBS)
- CBS Sneak Peek (CBS)

== Other ==
Taulere is a member of the Directors Guild of America; The Academy of Television Arts & Sciences and SACD (The French Director’s & Writer’s society).
Brother of singer Jocelyne Jocya
Born in Perpignan (France).
