= Percy Foreman =

American lawyer (1902–1988)

- Born: Percy Eugene Foreman; June 21, 1902 near Bold Springs, Texas, U.S.
- Died: August 25, 1988 (aged 86)
- Education: Staunton Military Academy; University of Texas (LLB)
- Occupation: Criminal defense attorney
- Known for: Representing many famous clients, including Edwin Walker, James Earl Ray, Charles Harrelson, and Candy Mossler
- Spouse: Marguerite
- Children: 2

Percy Eugene Foreman (June 21, 1902 – August 25, 1988) was an American criminal defense attorney from Houston, Texas largely known for representing many famous clients.

== Early life ==
Foreman was born near Bold Springs, Texas on June 21, 1902. Foreman moved to Livingston, Texas, when he was six years old. He was the son of Ransom Parson Hill Foreman and William Pinckney (Rogers) Foreman, a former sheriff of Polk County, Texas.

Foreman attended Staunton Military Academy in Virginia for one year, graduated from the University of Texas Law School in 1927, and was admitted to the Texas Bar on January 17, 1928.

== Career ==
Foreman was a respected master of tactics. He lost only 53 of 1500 death penalty cases and only one case resulted in execution (Steve Mitchell, electrocuted in Texas in 1951). He established himself as a lawyer and became wealthy through representing women in divorce cases, later he gained notoriety by defending accused murderers.

Foreman's clients included General Edwin Walker, James Earl Ray, Charles Harrelson, Candy Mossler, and various organized crime kingpins.

Foreman represented Dallas mobster Joseph Civello, he successfully overturned his 1959 "conspiracy" conviction on appeal. In 1962 he was hired by the far-right anti-communist general Edwin Walker after Walker was arrested on the charge that he "did forcibly assault, resist, impede, intimidate and interfere with United States marshals….while they were engaged in performance of their official duties" during the Ole Miss riot. The charges were later dropped. Together with lawyer Frank Ragano, Foreman defended Wynell Sue Edwards when she was charged with shooting her husband. Edwards was acquitted and the shooting was ruled accidental.

Jack Ruby requested that Foreman represent him after he shot Lee Harvey Oswald. Foreman declared "I go where I'm needed most. And right now, I can't think of anyone who needs my services more than Jack Ruby". However his representation lasted for only a few days before he quit over disagreements on legal strategy with Ruby's family. Famed defense attorneys Richard Haynes and Dick DeGuerin both worked with Foreman early in their careers and credit him as a mentor.

In November 1968 he represented James Earl Ray, who was accused of assassinating Martin Luther King. Ray had dismissed his previous lawyer, Arthur J. Hanes, thirty six hours before he was to go to trial, hiring Foreman as his replacement. Under Foreman's representation Ray entered a guilty plea in exchange for a 99-year sentence. Ray would later say that he only did so was because he had been pressured by Foreman to enter a plea in order to avoid the electric chair. Ray maintained that his only role in the assassination was to purchase the murder weapon and give it to a man named "Raoul". Ray claimed that Foreman told him if he pled guilty he would be out in two years, because Foreman knew who the next governor of Tennessee was going to be and he would pardon Ray. Foreman denied the allegation, stating that Ray told him "I don't care how long a sentence I get. I will be out of there in two years. There isn't a penitentiary that can hold me".

In December 1973, Ray filed a $500,000 lawsuit against Tennessee seeking his release from prison on the grounds that crucial evidence in his case was mishandled by Foreman. Foreman denied Ray's allegations, saying that he "spent approximately 20 hours over 4 1/2 days cross-examing Ray… At no time did he ever implicate anything or anybody other than himself." On 13 November 1978 Foreman testified before the House Select Committee on Assassinations (HSCA), which had been set up to reinvestigate the King and Kennedy assassinations.

He defended Charles Harrelson when he was tried for the 1968 murder of Alan Harry Berg. On September 22, 1970, he was acquitted by a jury in Angleton, Texas.

In July 1975 Foreman was indicted on obstruction of justice charges alongside Nelson Bunker Hunt, William Herbert Hunt, and others, after it was alleged that two private detectives had been bribed in return for their non-cooperation with the police. They were all acquitted.

In 1966, Foreman received the Golden Plate Award of the American Academy of Achievement. In April 1968 he appeared in a CBS news special, The Trial Lawyer, alongside his fellow lawyers Melvin Belli, F. Lee Bailey, and Edward Bennett Williams, where they discussed the merits and demerits of trial by jury. He went on to become one of the best known trial lawyers in Texas, with the Texas Criminal Defense Lawyers Association creating the Percy Foreman Lawyer of the Year Award in 1984.

== Personal life ==
Foreman was married twice. Foreman had a son, William, with his first wife and a daughter, Marguerite, with his second wife. In 1974 Foreman spent the night in jail after he was charged with drunk driving following involvement in a traffic accident. He was also charged with driving without a license. He was released on bail set at $400 and refused to take blood, urine or breath tests.

His sister Carrin Foreman was superintendent of the Sugar Land Independent School District from 1924 to 1930.

== See also ==
- Dominick Dunne's Power, Privilege, and Justice (episode: The Candy Scandal)
- Judd, for the Defense (television series with main character reportedly based on Percy Foreman)
