= Miracle-Ear =

Hearing aid and hearing care company

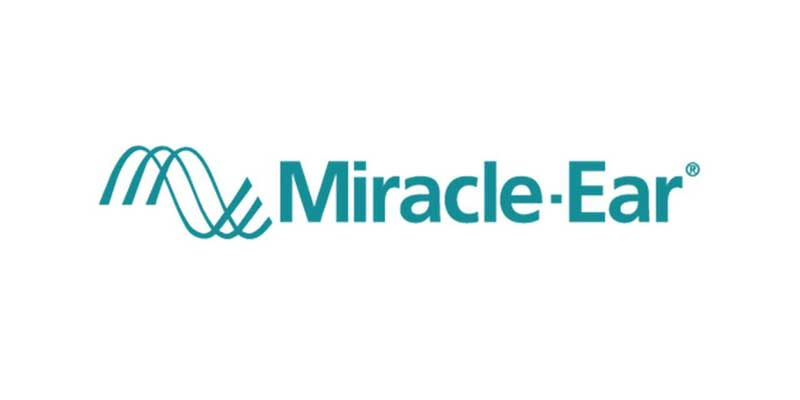
- Industry: Hearing aids, Health Care, Retail
- Predecessor: Dahlberg Electronics; Dahlberg, Inc.
- Founded: 1948; 78 years ago
- Founder: Kenneth Dahlberg
- Headquarters: Minneapolis, Minnesota, U.S.
- Number of locations: 1,500+
- Area served: United States
- Key people: Emiliano Di Vincenzo, Executive Vice President - Amplifon Americas
- Owner: Amplifon S.p.A.
- Website: miracle-ear.com

Miracle-Ear, Inc. is a hearing aid and hearing care company consisting of a network of franchised and corporately owned retail locations. The company is a subsidiary of Amplifon, retailer in hearing care and hearing aids based in Milan, Italy. Miracle-Ear's U.S. headquarters are located in Minneapolis, Minnesota. As of 2023 it has more than 1,500 locations in the United States,.

== History ==
=== The origin of Miracle-Ear ===
Miracle-Ear, Inc. began as a hearing aid manufactured by Dahlberg Electronics, an electronics company founded in 1948. Highly decorated WWII veteran, Kenneth Dahlberg started Dahlberg Electronics after he left a position as assistant to the president of Telex Communications, another manufacturer of hearing aids. Prior to manufacturing hearing aids, Dahlberg's company produced pillow radios for hospitals and motels.

In the early 1950s, Dahlberg Electronics began producing hearing aids that utilized the newly invented transistor technology – beginning with "hybrid" hearing aids that used transistors and vacuum tubes, and then releasing an all-transistor model in 1953. In 1955, they introduced the first so-called "in-the-ear" hearing aid, the D-10 Magic Ear – which concealed all electronic components in a shell snapped onto an earmold and weighed 1/2 ounce, including battery, three-transistor amplifier, microphone, and receiver. Other innovations included the D-14 "Solar Ear" eyeglasses hearing aid, which used a solar cell for power.

=== Further product innovations ===
In 1962, the Miracle-Ear IV was the first hearing aid that used integrated circuitry, and in 1971, the company introduced the Dahlberg SHARP circuit, an ultra-low power circuit utilizing in-house hybrid production. In 1988, the company debuted the Miracle-Ear Dolphin, the first programmable hearing aid on the market. Following university testing in 1997, the United States Food and Drug Administration (FDA) approved claims on Miracle-Ear's Sharp Plus circuitry that the Miracle-Ear devices improved hearing in the presence of background noise.

== Corporate history ==
Kenneth Dahlberg briefly sold his company to Motorola in 1959 but bought it back only 5 years later in 1964 when Motorola divested itself of consumer products. Miracle-Ear began franchising in 1984. Dahlberg sold the company to Bausch & Lomb in 1993. In 1999, Amplifon acquired Dahlberg, Inc. from Bausch & Lomb, and that year Dahlberg, Inc. and its subsidiary Miracle-Ear, Inc. merged into Miracle-Ear, Inc.
