= Martin Dardis =

American police chief (1922–2006)

- Dardis in 2005
- Born: November 25, 1922; Endicott, New York
- Died: May 16, 2006 (aged 83); Palm City, Florida
- Military career
- Allegiance: United States
- Branch: United States Army
- Service years: c. 1939–1945
- Rank: Sergeant
- Unit: 468th Antiaircraft Artillery Automatic Weapons Battalion
- Conflicts: World War II: Battle of the Bulge
- Awards: Silver Star; Bronze Star Medal; Purple Heart (2)
- Other work: Policeman, investigator and reporter

Martin F. Dardis (November 25, 1922 – May 16, 2006) was an American soldier, policeman, investigator, and reporter. As the chief investigator for the Dade County, Florida, state attorney in 1972, he was a key figure in the Watergate scandal, linking the Watergate burglars to President Richard Nixon's reelection campaign. He passed this information along to Washington Post reporter Carl Bernstein. Later, as a reporter for Sports Illustrated, he broke the story of baseball player Pete Rose's gambling.

== Early life and World War II ==
Born in Endicott, New York, Dardis dropped out of high school with an eighth-grade education. He lied about his age (16) to enlist in the United States Army.

During World War II, on December 29, 1944, Dardis was a gunner with the 468th Antiaircraft Artillery Automatic Weapons Battalion in General George Patton's Third Army during the Battle of the Bulge. After twelve hours, Dardis's crew and that of another half-track had shot down four German aircraft with 37-mm cannons and .50 caliber machine guns, while pinned down by aerial bombing and artillery and small arms fire along the Arlon-Bastogne road, for which the other crew were awarded Silver Stars. He and his comrades also rescued downed pilot Kenneth H. Dahlberg behind enemy lines; Dahlberg almost shot Dardis before the airman realized he was friendly. Their paths would cross again many years later.

By the time he was discharged from the Army in 1945, he had been awarded the Bronze Star Medal and two Purple Hearts.

In 1988, bothered that the other half-track crew had been awarded Silver Stars while his had not, Dardis began researching to build a case, forwarding his findings to the Military Awards Bureau and the Board to Correct Military Injustices. After 18 months of deliberation, a unanimous verdict was reached, and in June 1991, Silver Stars were awarded to Dardis and the four other members of his crew, though two had to be posthumous.

== Law enforcement career ==
=== Policeman and investigator ===
After leaving the Army, he became a policeman in his hometown of Endicott, then a New York state trooper. In the 1950s, he was the police chief of North Bay Village, Florida. He then became an investigator for Florida Attorney General Richard Ervin in the 1960s. When Ervin's term ended in 1964, Dardis went to work for Dade County state attorney Richard Gerstein. He also worked for Janet Reno.

=== Watergate ===
As Gerstein's chief investigator, in 1972 Dardis was tipped off about a connection between a Miami bank and Bernard Barker, one of the Watergate burglars who had been caught in the act inside the Democratic National Committee headquarters in the Watergate building. A check for $25,000 had recently been deposited in Barker's account. That check had been written by a major Republican fundraiser: Kenneth H. Dahlberg, the man Dardis had rescued in World War II. While Dahlberg was never accused of any wrongdoing, the money linked the burglars to Nixon's reelection campaign. When Washington Post reporter Carl Bernstein arrived at the state attorney's office, Dardis passed along the information, which contributed to the Post's coverage of what became known as the Watergate scandal, which led to Nixon's resignation in disgrace in 1974.

=== Other cases ===
Dardis continued to uncover other major crimes, including a "$862,000 fraud at Cedars of Lebanon Hospital in 1974" and "a $258,931 trifecta scam at Flagler Dog Track in 1977". In the late 1970s, he went undercover, posing as a crooked cop; the investigation led to the dismantling of a "drug ring with annual sales of $500 million". Threats persuaded Dardis to relocate his family back to Endicott, New York, in 1979.

== Reporter ==
In 1981, Dardis went to work for Sports Illustrated as an investigative reporter. He was involved in major stories, including Don Reese's revelation of widespread cocaine use in the National Football League and Pete Rose's gambling. He continued working for the sports magazine until about 2005.

== Personal life and death ==
Dardis married four times and divorced three times.

He died of vascular disease in Palm City, Florida at the age of 83. He was survived by his wife of 42 years, Barbara, their two children and four children by previous marriages. He was buried in section 69 of Arlington National Cemetery.

== Portrayals ==
He felt he was misrepresented in Woodward and Bernstein's book All the President's Men and the 1976 film adaptation. He complained that actor Ned Beatty played him as a "buffoon".
