= Ruth Reinhold =

American pilot and flight instructor (1902–1985)

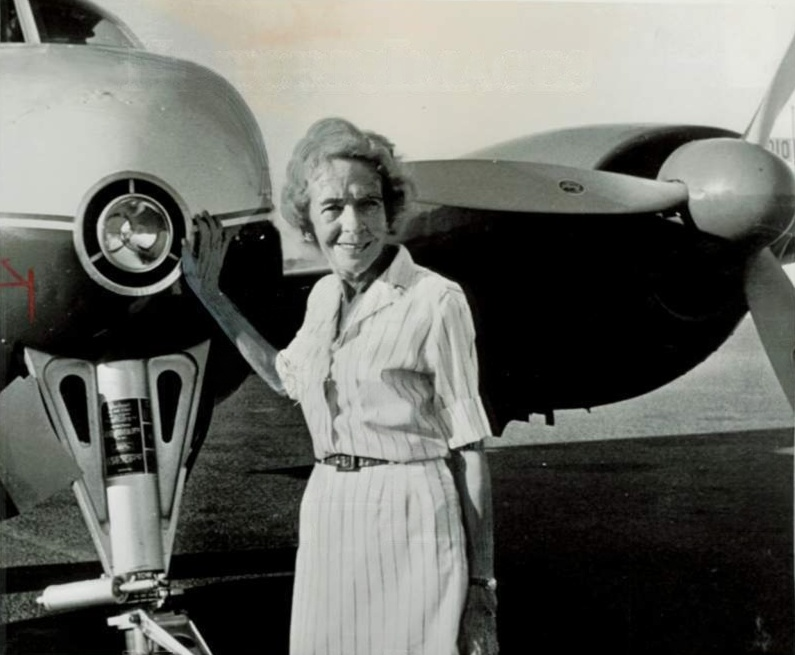
- Reinhold with Barry Goldwater's private plane in 1964
- Born: Ruth Cotterell Merrill; 1902; Boston, Massachusetts, US
- Died: December 17, 1985 (aged 82–83); Phoenix, Arizona, US
- Occupations: Pilot, flight instructor, author
- Organisations: Civil Air Patrol; Civilian Pilot Training Program
- Spouses: Louis James Chalmers (m. 1928) Robert Reinhold (m. 1944)

Ruth Reinhold (née Merrill; 1902 — December 17, 1985) was an American pilot and flight instructor. One of Arizona's first female pilots, she also worked as a flight instructor and served as a captain in the Civil Air Patrol.

== Biography ==
Reinhold was born in Boston, Massachusetts, in 1902. Her father was Meldon H. Merrill. She studied fine arts at Boston University and later attended UCLA. Reinhold moved to Arizona in 1933.

Reinhold learned to fly in Sky Harbor, Arizona. Prior to the start of World War II, Reinhold flew charter planes and taught in the Civilian Pilot Training Program. After the start of the war, Reinhold taught instrument flying to B-24 bomber pilots. She also served as a captain in the Civil Air Patrol and participated in search-and-rescue missions. Reinhold was just below five feet in height, and tower operators would refer to her plane as "pilotless" due to difficulty in seeing her in the plane's cockpit.

Reinhold was the first woman appointed to board for the Arizona Department of Aeronautics. She also was the private pilot for Senator Barry Goldwater, including during his presidential run. In 1982, she wrote and published a book on the history of aviation in Arizona entitled Sky Pioneering: Arizona in Aviation History.

=== Personal life ===
On July 2, 1928, Ruth married Louis James Chalmers in Los Angeles. Ruth married Robert Reinhold on April 21, 1944. The couple both worked at Phoenix Sky Harbor Flying Service, with Robert serving as maintenance chief and Ruth working as its secretary and instructor.

== Death and legacy ==
Reinhold died at Phoenix's St. Joseph's Hospital and Medical Center on December 17, 1985. She is remembered as one of Arizona's first female pilots, and is the namesake of Arizona's Ruth Reinhold Award, given to recognize significant contributions to aviation safety. Flight magazine Ninety-Nines called her "the foremost woman pilot in Arizona aviation history".

Her awards include:

- In 1969, Reinhold received the Amelia Earhart Award in honor of her dedication to aviation
- In 1986, Reinhold was inducted into the Arizona Women's Hall of Fame
- In 1991, Reinhold was inducted into the Arizona Aviation Hall of Fame
