= Tucson Military Vehicle Museum =

Military Museum in Pima County, Arizona

- Location in Arizona
- Established: March 21, 2025; 15 months ago
- Location: 6000 East Valencia Road; Tucson, Arizona, United States
- Coordinates: 32°08′20.2″N 110°52′07.3″W
- Type: Military Museum
- Director: Scott Marchand
- Website: www.tucsonmilitaryvehicle.org

The Tucson Military Vehicle Museum opened on Friday, March 21, 2025. The collection of over 60 military vehicles on display includes tanks, armored personnel carriers, amphibious assault vehicles, artillery and more.

== Overview ==
The Arizona Aerospace Foundation (AAF) acquired 77 acres (31 ha) to the east of the affiliated Pima Air & Space Museum and broke ground for the construction of the Tucson Military Vehicle Museum on Veterans Day, November 11, 2023. A large portion of the new museum's collection, 21 beautifully restored U.S. and British WWII vehicles, comes from the personal collection of the late Count Ferdinand von Galen, former AAF Chairman of the Board. It was donated by his family in memoriam, as was his wish. The National Museums of the U.S. Marine Corps, U.S. Army, and others have loaned the Foundation vehicles for display making for an inclusive collection of modern, vintage, domestic, and international examples. The U.S. General Services Administration has also been beneficial with assistance in procuring vehicles.

== See also ==
- Pima Air & Space Museum
- List of military museums
- Tucson, Arizona
- Pinal Airpark
