= Kidnapping of Virginia Piper =

1972 event in Minnesota, US

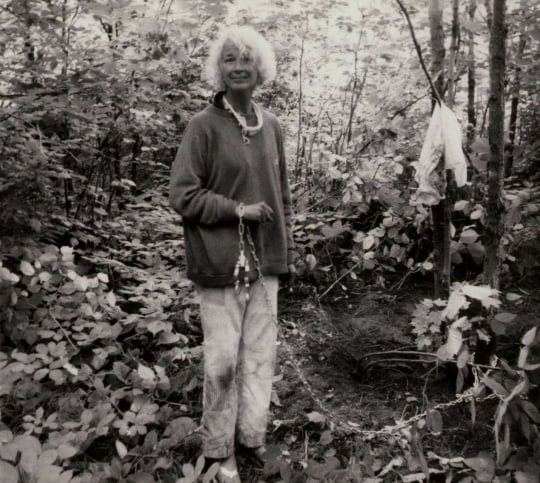
- Virginia Piper in Jay Cooke State Park after her rescue by the FBI
- Location: Orono, Minnesota
- Date: July 27, 1972
- Attack type: Kidnapping
- Victim: Virginia Piper
- Perpetrators: 2

Virginia Piper, the wife of Harry "Bobby" Piper, the chairman and CEO of the Minneapolis, Minnesota, investment firm Piper, Jaffray and Hopwood, Inc., was kidnapped on July 27, 1972, while gardening outside her home in Orono, Minnesota. She was held chained to a tree for two nights in Jay Cooke State Park near Duluth. After receiving a ransom payment of $1 million from her husband, the kidnappers called an unconnected person and told them her location. Shortly afterward, Piper was found and released by the FBI.

The kidnapping received national attention for several reasons: the prominence of the victim and her husband; the time (broad daylight) and location (a large and opulent estate) of her kidnapping; the time of the arrest of the two men eventually charged with the crime—just days before the five-year statute of limitations expired in 1977; their acquittal on appeal in 1979; and the fact that only $4,000 of the ransom the kidnappers received was ever recovered.

== Kidnapping ==
On Thursday July 27, 1972, Virginia Lewis Piper (nicknamed "Ginny") was handcuffed and blindfolded by two armed, masked men inside of her own home. Her husband, Harry C. Piper Jr. was a prominent Twin Cities investment banker. Both Bobby and Virginia were active members of the Twin Cities business community, and were active in social, philanthropic, and civic affairs. They lived near Lake Minnetonka.

The intruders likely intended to abduct Bobby Piper, but instead handcuffed and kidnapped Ginny. The kidnappers left a ransom note addressed to "Family" which demanded $1 million in unmarked twenty dollar bills with precise instructions for delivery. This was the most expensive demand the FBI had ever seen. The FBI immediately became involved; However, Bobby, ignoring the advice of the Bureau, delivered the money -- fifty-thousand twenties in a duffel bag weighing 110lbs -- on Friday night.

Bobby followed the instructions of the kidnappers, driving a circuitous route, parking behind a seedy bar, and trying to make a phone call. While in the bar, the ransom was almost certainly removed from his car. Bobby did not see who took the money, or learn the whereabouts of his wife.

On Saturday morning, an unidentified man called a local clergyman and told him the location of Ginny Piper. The FBI then recovered her from a heavily wooded area in Jay Cooke State Park. She was wet, hungry, exhausted, and traumatized, but physically unharmed. She was then flown back to the Twin Cites.

== Investigation and trials ==
The FBI manhunt involved hundreds of agents around the country, investigating more than a thousand people of interest, and spending tens of millions of dollars, making it one of the most extensive manhunts in FBI history. Sixteen days before the expiration of the five-year statute of limitations on kidnapping, two Twin Cities men, Kenneth Callahan and Donald Larson, were arrested and charged.

Tried in a federal courtroom, Callahan and Larson were prosecuted by Assistant U.S Attorney Thorwald Anderson and defended by local high-profile lawyers Ronald Meshbesher and Bruce Hartigan. A jury found the two men guilty, but the verdict was overturned on appeal. A second trial occurred two years after the first, and the defendants were found not guilty. The FBI claimed the second jury was mistaken, and that the case was closed.

Only about $4,000 of the ransom was ever found, turning up at banks in Owatonna, Rochester, Austin, Kasson, and Dodge Center.

== In popular culture ==
Both the book All the President's Men (1974) and its 1976 film adaptation reference Carl Bernstein and Bob Woodward's The Washington Post article "Bug Suspect Got Campaign Funds" (August 1, 1972), which reports that Piper's friend and neighbor Kenneth H. Dahlberg, the Midwest finance chairman of the Committee for the Re-Election of the President, mentioned the kidnapping to Woodward.

== Bibliography ==
- Swanson, William (October 15, 2014). Stolen from the Garden: The Kidnapping of Virginia Piper. Borealis Books. ISBN 9780873519489.

This article incorporates text from MNopedia, which is licensed under the Attribution-ShareAlike 4.0 International (CC-BY-SA 4.0) license.
