= Ralph Gibson (fighter pilot) =

American flying ace (1924–2009)

Ralph Duane Gibson
- Born: November 7, 1924; Keensburg, Illinois, U.S.
- Died: January 2, 2009 (aged 84); Tucson, Arizona, U.S.
- Burial place: East Lawn Palms Cemetery, Tucson
- Military career
- Allegiance: United States of America
- Branch: United States Army Air Forces; United States Air Force
- Service years: 1943–1974
- Rank: Colonel
- Nickname: "Hoot"
- Unit: 4th Fighter-Interceptor Wing
- Commands: 433rd Tactical Fighter Squadron
- Conflicts: World War II; Korean War; Vietnam War
- Awards: Silver Star (2); Legion of Merit; Distinguished Flying Cross (3); Bronze Star; Meritorious Service Medal; Air Medal (14)

Ralph Duane "Hoot" Gibson (November 7, 1924 – January 2, 2009) was an American flying ace of the Korean War. He became the nation's third jet fighter ace with a total tally of five downed MiG-15 fighters. He also flew in the Vietnam War, and was a former lead pilot for the United States Air Force Thunderbirds.

== Early life ==
Gibson was born in 1924, in Keensburg, Illinois and raised in Mt. Carmel. He entered United States Army Air Forces flight school in 1943 and graduated the next year. Gibson did not participate in World War II becoming a second lieutenant later in 1946 while participating in the occupation of Japan.

== Korean War ==
Gibson requested combat duty at the onset of the Korean War in 1950. He flew the F-86 Sabre with the 4th Fighter-Interceptor Wing based at Kimpo Air Base in South Korea. Having been promoted to first lieutenant, Gibson entered the war with the advantage of some 1,792 hours of pilot in command fighter time. Gibson's tally began on June 18, 1951, with the downing of two MiG-15 fighter aircraft. He was credited with two further kills on July 11 and September 2, and his last on September 9. The fifth kill earned him the status of ace. By this time he had been awarded the Silver Star twice, and by the end of the war he had flown 94 combat missions.

== After Korea ==
After the Korean war ended in 1953, Gibson transitioned to the F-100 Super Sabre and later the F-4 Phantom II. As a lieutenant colonel, he commanded the 433rd Tactical Fighter Squadron (part of the 8th Tactical Fighter Wing) based at Ubon Air Base in Thailand, and flew 105 combat missions during the Vietnam War from 1967 to 1968. He also had two tours in West Germany and a tour as the leader of the United States Air Force Thunderbirds. He was promoted to colonel in 1968 and retired in 1974.

== Final years ==
After retirement Gibson was inducted into the Illinois Military Aviation Hall of Fame, and he started a successful second career selling real estate in Tucson, Arizona. Having established himself in the state, he was further honoured with an induction into the Arizona Aviation Hall of Fame. Gibson died on January 2, 2009, after falling and striking his head while showing property to prospective buyers. He was 84.

== Awards and decorations ==
His military decorations and awards include the Silver Star with oak leaf cluster, Legion of Merit, Distinguished Flying Cross with two oak leaf clusters with 'V' device, Air Medal with 12 oak leaf clusters and Air Force Commendation Medal.

US Air Force Command Pilot Badge
Silver Star w/ 1 bronze oak leaf cluster
Legion of Merit	Distinguished Flying Cross w/ Valor device and 2 bronze oak leaf clusters	Bronze Star Medal
Meritorious Service Medal	Air Medal w/ 2 silver and 2 bronze oak leaf clusters	Air Medal (second ribbon required for accouterment spacing)
Air Force Commendation Medal	Air Force Presidential Unit Citation with two bronze oak leaf clusters	Air Force Outstanding Unit Award w/ Valor device and silver oak leaf cluster
Combat Readiness Medal	Army Good Conduct Medal	American Campaign Medal
World War II Victory Medal	Army of Occupation Medal	National Defense Service Medal w/ bronze service star
Korean Service Medal w/ 3 bronze campaign stars	Vietnam Service Medal w/ bronze campaign star	Air Force Longevity Service Award w/ silver and bronze oak leaf clusters
Small Arms Expert Marksmanship Ribbon	Republic of Korea Presidential Unit Citation	Republic of Vietnam Gallantry Cross
United Nations Service Medal for Korea	Vietnam Campaign Medal	Korean War Service Medal

== See also ==
- List of Korean War air aces
