= Ruthann Aron =

American politician (born 1942)

- Born: Ruthann Greenzweig; October 24, 1942 (age 83); Brooklyn, New York, U.S.
- Other names: Ruth Ann Green (alias); Ruth Ann Aron Green (alias)
- Occupations: Former politician, former real estate developer

Ruthann Aron (née Greenzweig; born October 24, 1942), now known as Ruth Ann Green, is an American felon, former politician, and former real estate developer who ran unsuccessfully for the Republican nomination in the 1994 United States Senate election in Maryland. She was arrested in 1997 for hiring a hitman to murder her ex-husband, Barry Aron.

== Career ==
Ruthann Aron was born Ruthann Greenzweig in Brooklyn, New York. After graduating from Cornell University, she moved to Maryland with her husband and two young children, acquired a law degree at Catholic University and became a real estate developer. Aron completed several big deals and became a member of the Montgomery County Planning Board. In 1994, she lost Maryland's Republican Senate nomination to former Tennessee Senator Bill Brock, who was in turn defeated by the Democratic, incumbent Paul Sarbanes.

After the general election, Aron sued Brock for slander based on comments he had made implying that she had been criminally convicted of fraud during her business career. In reality, juries had ruled against Aron in two civil lawsuits in which former business partners accused her of fraud or other offenses. A federal judge overturned one of the verdicts, and Aron settled both suits out of court after she agreed to pay about $175,000 in each case. At the slander trial, Aron cited Brock's use of the term "convicted" for verdicts that had come in civil court. The lawyer Arthur G. Kahn, who had prosecuted one of the fraud cases, testified against Aron at the February 1996 trial, which Aron lost. Nonetheless, it was the first time that a losing federal candidate got the winner to court over words spoken in a campaign.

== Attempted contract killings ==
Aron was arrested in June 1997 for trying to hire a hitman. She had approached William "Billy" Mossberg, a local landfill owner, who immediately went to the police. Secretly working with investigators, Mossberg met with Aron and agreed to murder her husband and Kahn. At the time of her arrest, Aron was planning to run as a Democrat for an at-large seat on the Montgomery County Council. She was removed from the Planning Board two months after her arrest.

In Aron's first trial, she used nine expert witnesses to argue that a brain injury and childhood abuse had rendered her incapable of realizing that what she was doing was illegal. She was diagnosed as having borderline personality disorder by multiple psychiatrists. One juror held out on her behalf, and a mistrial was declared. In July 1998, Aron pleaded no contest, and in November 1998, she was sentenced to two consecutive 18-month prison sentences.

== Aftermath ==
Aron's son, Joshua, was an employee at Cantor Fitzgerald's offices at the World Trade Center and was killed in the 9/11 attacks. Her daughter, Dana Aron Weiner, is a psychologist who works at Northwestern University in Chicago. At Aron's trial, Weiner pleaded for clemency on her mother's behalf. Aron was still living in New York City as of September 2011.

In 2004, Aron's case was profiled on the Oxygen Network series Snapped, which profiles female criminals, and also on the truTV series Dominick Dunne's Power, Privilege, and Justice. In 2006, her case was profiled in an episode of A&E's City Confidential.

== Personal life ==
It was reported in May 2016 that Aron was going by the name Ruth Ann Green and living in Montgomery County, Maryland, and in Palm Beach, Florida. She has self-published an autobiography claiming her innocence on the charges on which she was convicted. She is Jewish.
