= Dominick Dunne's Power, Privilege, and Justice =

American crime television series

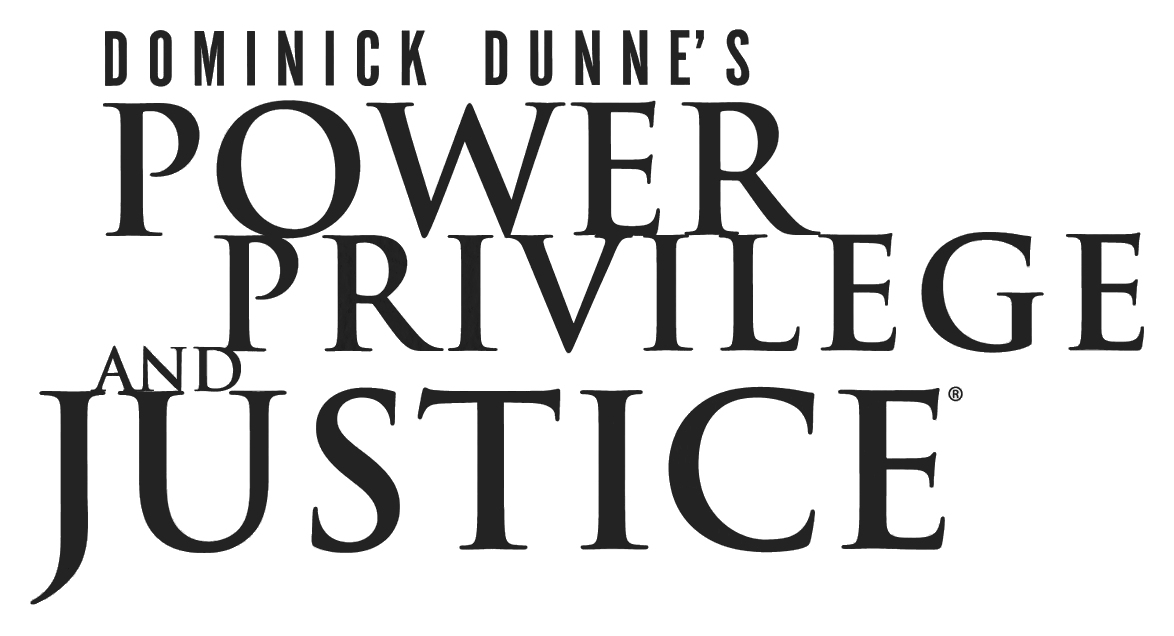
- Genre: True crime
- Directed by: Patrick Taulère; David Cargill
- Presented by: Dominick Dunne
- Country of origin: United States
- Original language: English
- No. of episodes: 62

Production
- Producers: David Cargill; David Connelly; Joseph Peicott; Patrick Shea; Patrick Taulère
- Running time: 48 mins.

Original release
- Network: truTV
- Release: June 19, 2002 – September 25, 2009

Dominick Dunne's Power, Privilege, and Justice is an American true crime television series that examines real-life cases of crime, passion, and greed involving privileged or famous people. The episodes were shown on truTV (formerly Court TV) and on Star TV in Canada as well as Zone Reality/CBS Reality in Europe and Bio. in Australia. The host of the show was Dominick Dunne. The series started in 2002 and ended in late 2009 with Dunne's death. Digital multicaster Justice Network currently shows reruns of the program.

== List of episodes ==
=== Season 1 ===
No. overall	No. in season	Title	Original release date
1	1	"Death Do Us Part"	June 19, 2002
2	2	"Billionaire Boys Club"	June 26, 2002
The Billionaire Boys Club, a social club and Ponzi scheme orchestrated by Joe Hunt, is profiled.
3	3	"A Scandal in Hunt County"	June 26, 2002
Heiress Susan Cummings is charged in the shooting death of her polo player boyfriend, Roberto Villegas.
4	4	"Miami Vices"	July 3, 2002
Young Miami socialite Joyce Cohen plots to have her husband, Stanley Cohen, murdered.
5	5	"Unbridled Greed"	July 17, 2002
The suspicious death of racehorse Alydar reveals the financial troubles at Calumet Farm.
6	6	"Mystery in the Hamptons"	July 24, 2002
The secrets of Wall Street securities analyst are exposed when he is charged with killing his wife.

=== Season 2 ===
No. overall	No. in season	Title	Original release date
7	1	"Brothers in Arms"	December 30, 2002
Brothers Lyle and Erik Menendez are accused of shotgun murders of their wealthy parents in Beverly Hills.
8	2	"Maternal Instincts"	January 15, 2003
The drug-addicted girlfriend of a DuPont heiress's son is found murdered in a seedy Las Vegas motel room.
9	3	"Gentleman's Agreement"	January 22, 2003
The owner of Sotheby's auction house, A. Alfred Taubman, is implicated in a price fixing scheme.
10	4	"What the Butler Saw"	March 12, 2003
Paul Burrell, the former butler for Princess Diana is accused of stealing from the royal family.
11	5	"Run from Justice"	March 19, 2003
Alex Kelly of Darien, Connecticut flees to Europe for seven years to avoid prosecution for two rapes.
12	6	"Sweet Seduction"	March 26, 2003
Helen Brach, an heiress of Brach's Candy Company, disappears and the investigation reveals more horrible crimes.

=== Season 3 ===
No. overall	No. in season	Title	Original release date
13	1	"The Waitress and the Millionaire"	July 30, 2003
Country club waitress Celeste Beard marries a rich, older man who is shot dead by her lesbian lover.
14	2	"Mystery in the Caribbean"	August 6, 2003
The body of former model and aspiring artist Lois McMillen washes up on the shores on Tortola.
15	3	"Oil, Money and Mystery"	August 13, 2003
Oil heir T. Cullen Davis fatally shoots his estranged wife's twelve year-old daughter and her boyfriend.
16	4	"Evil Deeds"	August 27, 2003
Andrew Luster, heir to the Max Factor cosmetics fortune, is on the run and captured by Duane Chapman.
17	5	"Tailspin"	September 3, 2003
College student Dana Ewell orchestrates the triple murder of his parents and sister so he can inherit the family fortune.
18	6	"Blood Money"	September 10, 2003
Steven Benson uses a car bomb to kill his mother, a tobacco heiress, and his brother, a tennis player.

=== Season 4 ===
No. overall	No. in season	Title	Original release date
19	1	"Island Obsession"	January 7, 2004
Ex-windsurfing champion Enrico "Chico" Forti is accused of fraud at the Pikes Hotel and the murder of Dale Pike.
20	2	"Martha Stewart on Trial"	January 14, 2004
Martha Stewart's highly-publicized trial for her involvement in the ImClone stock trading case is profiled.
21	3	"A Deadly Campaign"	January 21, 2004
Up-and-coming politician Ruthann Aron is embroiled in a murder-for-hire plot involving her husband and an attorney.
22	4	"Freefall"	February 18, 2004
Andrew C. Thornton II and his friends become involved in an international drug smuggling ring.
23	5	"Family Secrets"	February 25, 2004
The Franklin Bradshaw murder case reveals a mother's deadly manipulation of her teenage son.
24	6	"Murder, He Wrote"	March 3, 2004
Author Michael Peterson claims his wife Kathleen's suspicious death was the result of falling down the stairs.

=== Season 5 ===
No. overall	No. in season	Title	Original release date
25	1	"A Marriage of Inconvenience"	January 1, 2005
Socialite Lita McClinton is gunned down the day before her divorce, and the case takes nearly twenty years to solve.
26	2	"The Two Mrs. Woodwards"	January 12, 2005
Ann Woodward shoots her husband, William Woodward, Jr., to death, claiming that she thought he was a prowler.
27	3	"Death of a Beauty King"	January 26, 2005
Cosmetics magnate Dean Milo is killed in his Ohio home, and the investigation points police to his brother Fred.
28	4	"What Price Murder?"	February 2, 2005
Pennsylvania multimillionaire Joel Sandler hires a hit man to kill his estranged wife Linda after she files for divorce.
29	5	"Mystery in the Mansion"	February 9, 2005
Elisabeth Congdon, the wealthiest woman in Minnesota, is found dead and her daughter Marjorie is a prime suspect.
30	6	"Crime of Fashion"	February 9, 2005
Maurizio Gucci, the former head of Gucci, is gunned down, and his ex-wife Patrizia Reggiani is convicted in the crime.
31	7	"Rich Man, Poor Man"	February 16, 2005
New York City investment banker Ted Ammon is murdered during his divorce from his estranged wife Generosa Ammon.
32	8	"Doctor of Deceit"	February 23, 2005
Plastic surgeon Robert Bierenbaum is convicted of strangling his wife and dumping her body in the Atlantic Ocean.

=== Season 6 ===
No. overall	No. in season	Title	Original release date
33	1	"Deadly Designs"	January 9, 2006
Spree killer Andrew Cunanan is responsible for at least five murders, including fashion designer Gianni Versace.
34	2	"Mystery in the Mountains"	January 16, 2006
The wife of a millionaire Newport Beach developer, Bonnie Hood is found dead in her Sierra Nevada lodge.
35	3	"Shootout in Bel-Air"	January 23, 2006
Henry Harrison Kyle, the CEO of Four Star Television is gunned down in his Bel Air mansion by his son Ricky.
36	4	"The Trophy Wife and the Tennis Pro"	January 30, 2006
Debra Hartmann is accused of soliciting the murder of her older husband, a multimillionaire car stereo salesman.
37	5	"The Starlet and the Skier"	February 6, 2006
Singer-actress Claudine Longet goes on trial in the shooting of her boyfriend, Olympic skier Spider Sabich.
38	6	"Deception in Dallas"	February 20, 2006
Joy Aylor, the daughter of a wellbred developer, orchestrates the murder of her husband's lover Rozanne Gailiunas.

=== Season 7 ===
No. overall	No. in season	Title	Original release date
39	1	"The Heiress and the Hit Man"	January 24, 2007
The widow of a successful businessman, Phoenix, Arizona socialite Jeanne Tovrea is found shot dead in her bed.
40	2	"Biloxi Confidential"	January 31, 2007
In Biloxi, Mississippi, a local judge and his wife are murdered, and it takes investigators years to solve the case.
41	3	"The Candy Scandal"	February 7, 2007
Candy Mossler's relationship with her nephew Melvin Lane Powers is at the center of her wealthy husband's murder.
42	4	"Over The Edge"	February 14, 2007
Peter Bergna, a wealthy art appraiser from Lake Tahoe, kills his wife and stages her death as a car crash off a cliff.
43	5	"Family Betrayal"	February 21, 2007
Ten years after Janet March mysteriously vanishes, her husband Perry, a successful lawyer, is charged with her murder.
44	6	"Family Plot"	February 28, 2007
Texas teen Kristi Koslow orchestrates a deadly attack on her father, millionaire Jack Koslow, and his wife, Caren Koslow.
45	7	"Cape Fear"	March 7, 2007
Fashion writer Christa Worthington is killed by waste collector Christopher McCowen in her home on Cape Cod.

=== Season 8 ===
No. overall	No. in season	Title	Original release date
46	1	"Deadly Delivery"	January 4, 2008
Phoenix businessman Robert Levine orchestrates the murders of his brother and sister-in-law in Munster, Indiana.
47	2	"House of Secrets"	January 11, 2008
The suspicious deaths of Bruce and Darlene Rouse leave their three children as the prime suspects in their murders.
48	3	"Traces of Evil"	January 18, 2008
The daughter of a Dallas real estate tycoon, Nancy Dillard Lyon dies with a fatal amount of arsenic in her system.
49	4	"Tragedy in Telluride"	January 25, 2008
Members of the Shoen family, heirs of U-Haul, blame each other when Eva Shoen is killed in her Telluride, Colorado chalet.
50	5	"Death of a Salesman"	February 1, 2008
Wealthy businessman Rick Chance is found slain in a hotel room, and two strippers become the prime suspects in his murder.
51	6	"Mystery in Monaco"	February 8, 2008
Ted Maher is a registered nurse on trial for a deadly fire that killed Edmond Safra and Vivian Torrente in Safra's penthouse.
52	7	"The Von Bulow Affair"	February 15, 2008
Socialite Claus von Bülow is suspected of inducing his wife Sunny's coma by administering an overdose of insulin.

=== Season 9 ===
No. overall	No. in season	Title	Original release date
53	1	"Heart of Stone"	July 24, 2009
A Manhattan diamond dealer's fraud scheme leads to the deaths of two company employees and three CBS technicians.
54	2	"Burning Obsession"	July 31, 2009
When David Coffin is found shot dead in his burning home, the investigation centers around his girlfriend's ex, Scott Davis.
55	3	"Sinister Harvest"	August 7, 2009
Hanford, California teen Kevin Yocum conspires with friends to kill his parents so he can collect on his inheritance.
56	4	"Billionaire on the Run"	August 14, 2009
Robert Durst becomes the prime suspect in the murders of Kathleen McCormack, Susan Berman, and Morris Black.
57	5	"A Deadly Parlay"	August 21, 2009
The murder of Doris Angleton exposes her husband's bookmaking business, and implicates her brother-in-law as a killer.
58	6	"Programmed for Murder"	August 28, 2009
Hans Reiser, a computer programmer, becomes a suspect in the disappearance and murder of his wife Nina.
59	7	"Robert Blake"	September 4, 2009
Actor Robert Blake goes on trial for the shooting death of Bonnie Lee Bakley, his second wife of only six months.
60	8	"Strange Bedfellows"	August 14, 2009
Nevada State Controller Kathy Augustine dies suspiciously, and the drug succinylcholine is found in her autopsy results.
61	9	"Dirty Secrets Down Under"	September 18, 2009
Shirley Withers is responsible for plotting the murder of her boyfriend, Melbourne, Australia millionaire Peter Shellard.
62	10	"Phil Spector"	September 25, 2009
Music producer Phil Spector ends up on trial when actress Lana Clarkson is found dead in his Alhambra, California mansion.

== Comments ==
The show started in 2002 and ended with Dunne's death in 2009. Several of the episodes had intersected with his career. The show had "one of the best true-crime writers" of its time, Dominick Dunne. Linda Stasi comments that Dunne reports on the rich and powerful when they kill, and analyzes how they are more likely to get away with it, indicating "Dunne nails them - no holds barred." Listed in the Encyclopedia of Television Shows 1925-2010, the series is described to present "a look at the dark side of the law" where the rich and famous try to beat the legal system.
