= Pima Air & Space Museum =

Aeronautical museum in Pima County, Arizona

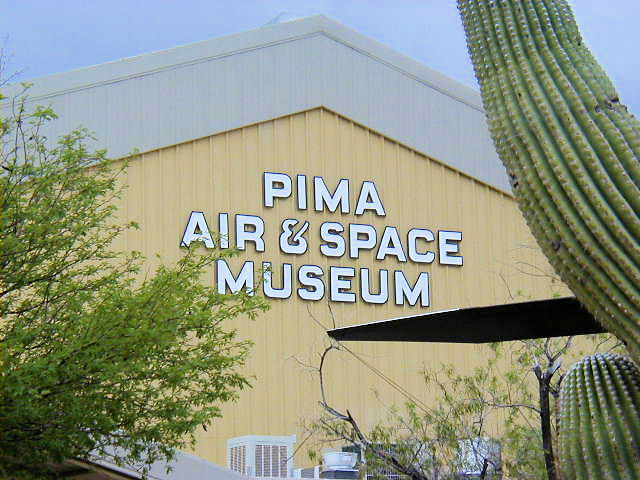
- The main entrance to the museum

- Location in Arizona
- Established: May 8, 1976; 50 years ago
- Location: 6000 East Valencia Road; Tucson, Arizona, United States
- Coordinates: 32°08′20.2″N 110°52′07.3″W
- Type: Aviation museum
- Director: Scott Marchand
- Website: pimaair.org

The Pima Air & Space Museum is an aerospace museum in Tucson, Arizona, US. It features a display of nearly 400 aircraft spread out over 80 acres (32 ha) on a campus occupying 127 acres (51 ha). It has also been the home to the Arizona Aviation Hall of Fame since 1991.

== Overview ==
A large number of the museum's aircraft are displayed outside with the remainder located in one of the museum's six display hangars. In addition to the display hangars, the museum has a restoration hangar.

Opened to the public in May 1976 with 48 aircraft then on display, the museum's main hangar houses an SR-71A Blackbird, an A-10 Warthog, a United States Air Force Through the Years exhibit, and a mock-up of a control tower.

The museum is adjacent to Davis-Monthan Air Force Base. The 309th Aerospace Maintenance and Regeneration Group (AMARG), affiliated with the base, also known as the "Graveyard of Planes" or "The Boneyard", is the largest aircraft storage and preservation facility in the world.

== History ==
The museum opened to the public on May 8, 1976. In early 1982 the first hangar on the site was completed. A second was built in 1987, a third in 1992, and a fourth in 1994. After running into difficulty in the late 1990s, the museum recovered and continued expanding.

In 1984, construction began on another structure within the grounds of the Pima Air and Space Museum: the 390th Memorial Museum, previously located across town at the Davis-Monthan Air Force Base. Construction started with the Joseph M. Moller Library, and later expanded to include a hangar completed in 1987 to protect and display a B-17G on loan from the U.S. Air Force. While the 390th Memorial Museum and the Pima Air & Space Museum are separate entities, they are physically and conceptually associated through their spatial proximity.

The museum opened the 42,000-square-foot (3,900 m^{2}) Spirit of Freedom Hangar in 2007.

In 2012, the museum collaborated with artists, in The Boneyard Project, to place some abandoned aircraft on display as canvases for art.

During 2015, Boeing donated to the museum a flight test 787 aircraft which is the second built. It is exhibited in the colors of the 787 customer, ANA.

In November 2016, Orbis International donated their first McDonnell-Douglas DC-10 Flying Eye Hospital to the museum, after receiving a second DC-10 from FedEx. The DC-10, which was the oldest flying example of its type and at the time of its donation, while being the oldest surviving example and the second overall built, was restored for display at Davis–Monthan Air Force Base.

The museum acquired 77 acres (31 ha) in January 2021 for the construction of the Tucson Military Vehicle Museum. The new museum will house a large number of mostly land vehicles, including 50 donated by the Imperial War Museum.

A disassembled Martin Mars arrived at the museum in May 2025, having landed at Lake Pleasant three months earlier.

== Selected aircraft on display ==
Out of a collection of 400 aircraft, these are the most prominent:

- Boeing 777-200 (B-HNL)
- Boeing B-17 Flying Fortress^{†}
- Boeing B-29 Superfortress
- Consolidated B-24 Liberator
- Convair B-36J Peacemaker
- English Electric Lightning
- Lockheed SR-71 Blackbird
- Martin PBM Mariner
- North American F-107
- Aero Spacelines Super Guppy
- N747GE (Boeing 747-based engine testbed)
- Boeing 787
- McDonnell Douglas DC-10 (Originally Orbis Flying Eye Hospital)
- SOFIA

† B-17G serial number 44-85828 is on display at the 390th Memorial Museum, co-located on the grounds of the Pima Air & Space Museum.

In addition to other ephemera, the museum contains the Shuttle Mission Simulator's GNS (Guidance and Navigation Simulator) trainer, and a full-size mockup of the Solid Rocket Booster.

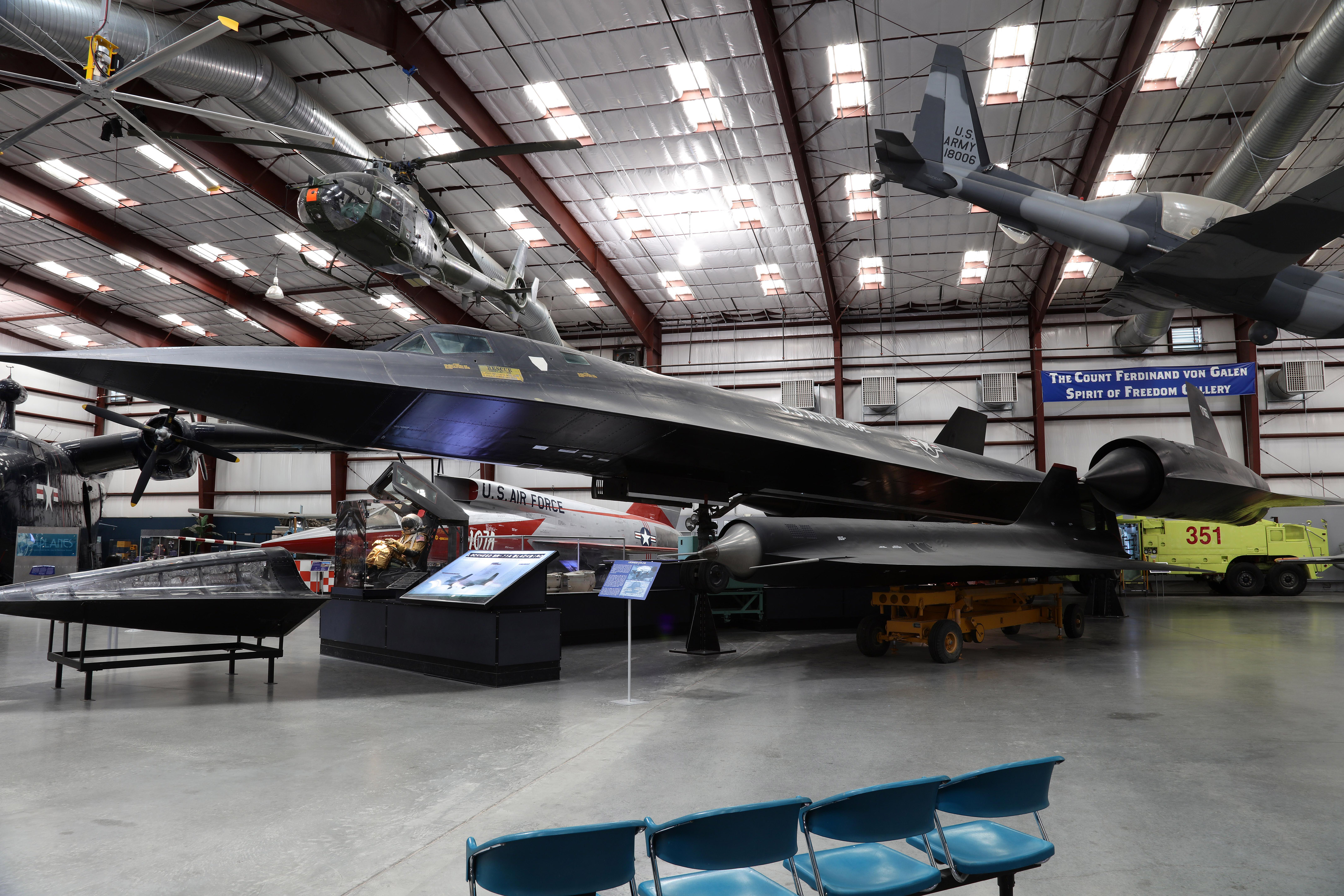
SR-71 Blackbird

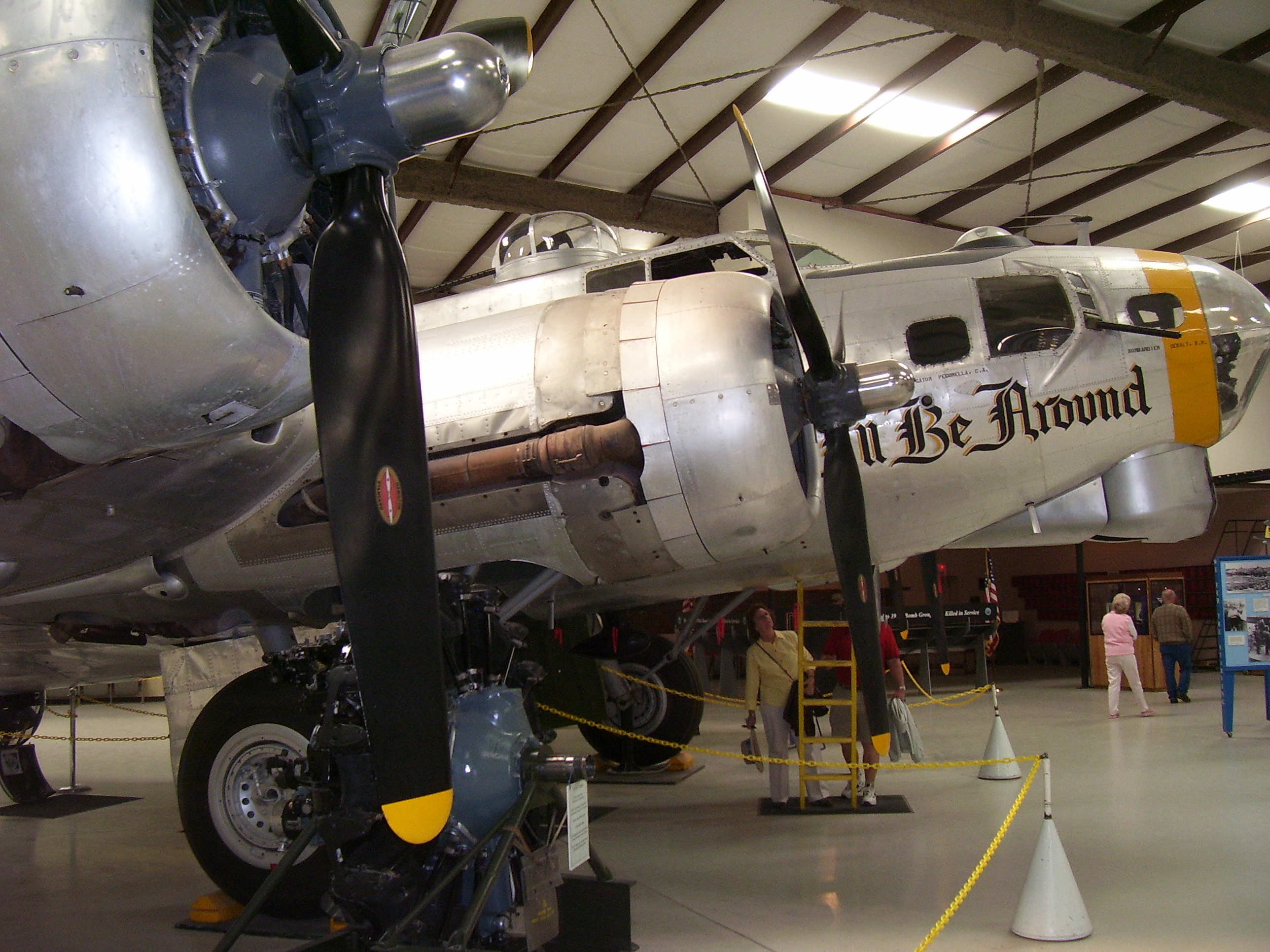
Boeing B-17G 44-85828, wearing the livery of 42-31892 "I'll Be Around"

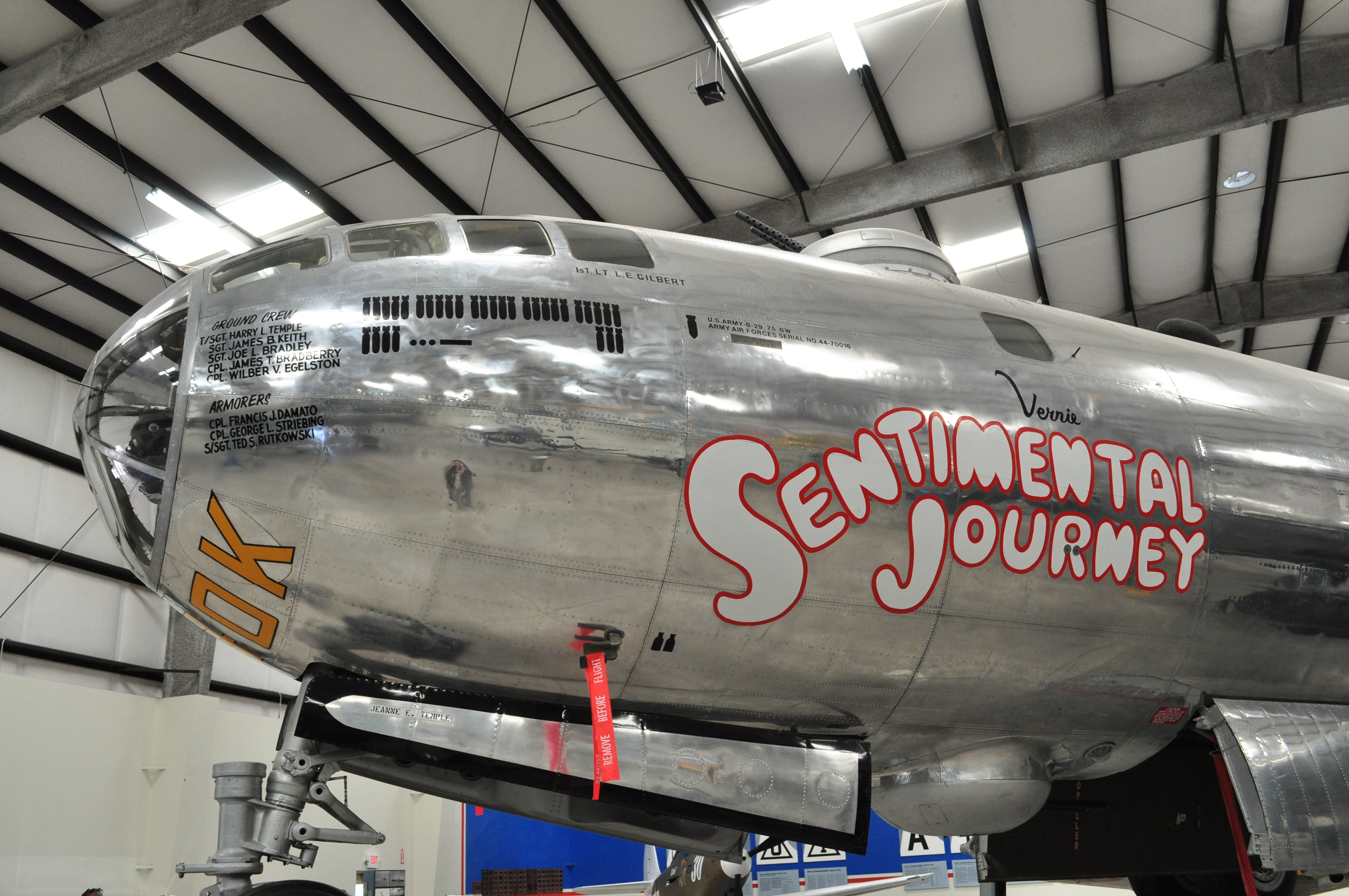
Boeing B-29 Superfortress 44-70016

== See also ==
- List of aerospace museums
- Pinal Airpark
