= Frederick Edgar Ferguson =

United States Army Medal of Honor recipient

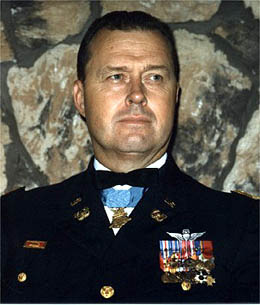
- Frederick Ferguson, Medal of Honor recipient
- Born: August 18, 1939 (age 87); Pilot Point, Texas, U.S.
- Military career
- Allegiance: United States
- Branch: United States Army
- Service years: 1958–1982
- Rank: Major
- Units: 227th Aviation Battalion, 1st Cavalry Division (Airmobile)
- Conflicts: Vietnam War; Battle of Hue
- Awards: Medal of Honor; Silver Star (2); Distinguished Flying Cross; Bronze Star Medal; Air Medal (39)

Frederick Edgar Ferguson (born August 18, 1939) is a former United States Army warrant officer and later officer, as well as a recipient of the United States military's highest decoration—the Medal of Honor—for his actions in the Vietnam War while a chief warrant officer 3.

== Biography ==
Ferguson joined the United States Army from Phoenix, Arizona in 1958, and by January 31, 1968 was a chief warrant officer 3 in command of a UH-1 Huey as part of Company C, 227th Aviation Battalion, 1st Cavalry Division (Airmobile). On that day, Ferguson voluntarily piloted his aircraft through intense enemy fire to rescue the crew and passengers of a downed helicopter in Huế, South Vietnam.

After returning to Phoenix as a civilian in 1962, Ferguson joined the Civil Air Patrol, in which he served as a Mission Pilot and Commandant of Cadets for Phoenix's Squadron 308-C. He attained the rank of 2nd Lt after 4 years of service to CAP.

In addition to the Medal of Honor—the first awarded to a United States Army aviator in Vietnam, and the first in modern army aviation history—Ferguson was awarded two Silver Stars, the Distinguished Flying Cross, the Bronze Star Medal, and 39 Air Medals.

Ferguson's additional honors include Military Aviator of the Year ("Kitty Hawk" Award of the Wright Brother's Committee), the President's Award, the U.S. Army Aviation Hall of Fame, and the Arizona Aviation Hall of Fame. He was also honored by the US Postal Service along with 23 other Vietnam Medal of Honor recipients with a limited edition stamp.

Ferguson served in the Arizona Army National Guard, rising to the rank of major before reverting to warrant officer rank in order to continue instructing in the UH-1.

Ferguson was deputy director of the Arizona Department of Veterans' Services in 2000.

== Medal of Honor citation ==
Chief Warrant Officer Ferguson's official Medal of Honor citation reads:

For conspicuous gallantry and intrepidity in action at the risk of his life above and beyond the call of duty. CWO Ferguson, U.S. Army distinguished himself while serving with Company C. CWO Ferguson, commander of a resupply helicopter monitoring an emergency call from wounded passengers and crewmen of a downed helicopter under heavy attack within the enemy-controlled city of Hue, unhesitatingly volunteered to attempt evacuation. Despite warnings from all aircraft to stay clear of the area due to heavy antiaircraft fire, CWO Ferguson began a low-level flight at maximum airspeed along the Perfume River toward the tiny, isolated South Vietnamese Army compound in which the crash survivors had taken refuge. Coolly and skillfully maintaining his course in the face of intense, short range fire from enemy occupied buildings and boats, he displayed superior flying skill and tenacity of purpose by landing his aircraft in an extremely confined area in a blinding dust cloud under heavy mortar and small-arms fire. Although the helicopter was severely damaged by mortar fragments during the loading of the wounded, CWO Ferguson disregarded the damage and, taking off through the continuing hail of mortar fire, he flew his crippled aircraft on the return route through the rain of fire that he had experienced earlier and safely returned his wounded passengers to friendly control. CWO Ferguson's extraordinary determination saved the lives of 5 of his comrades. His actions are in the highest traditions of the military service and reflect great credit on himself and the U.S. Army.

== See also ==
- List of Medal of Honor recipients for the Vietnam War
