= Melvin Lane Powers =

American businessman (1942–2010)

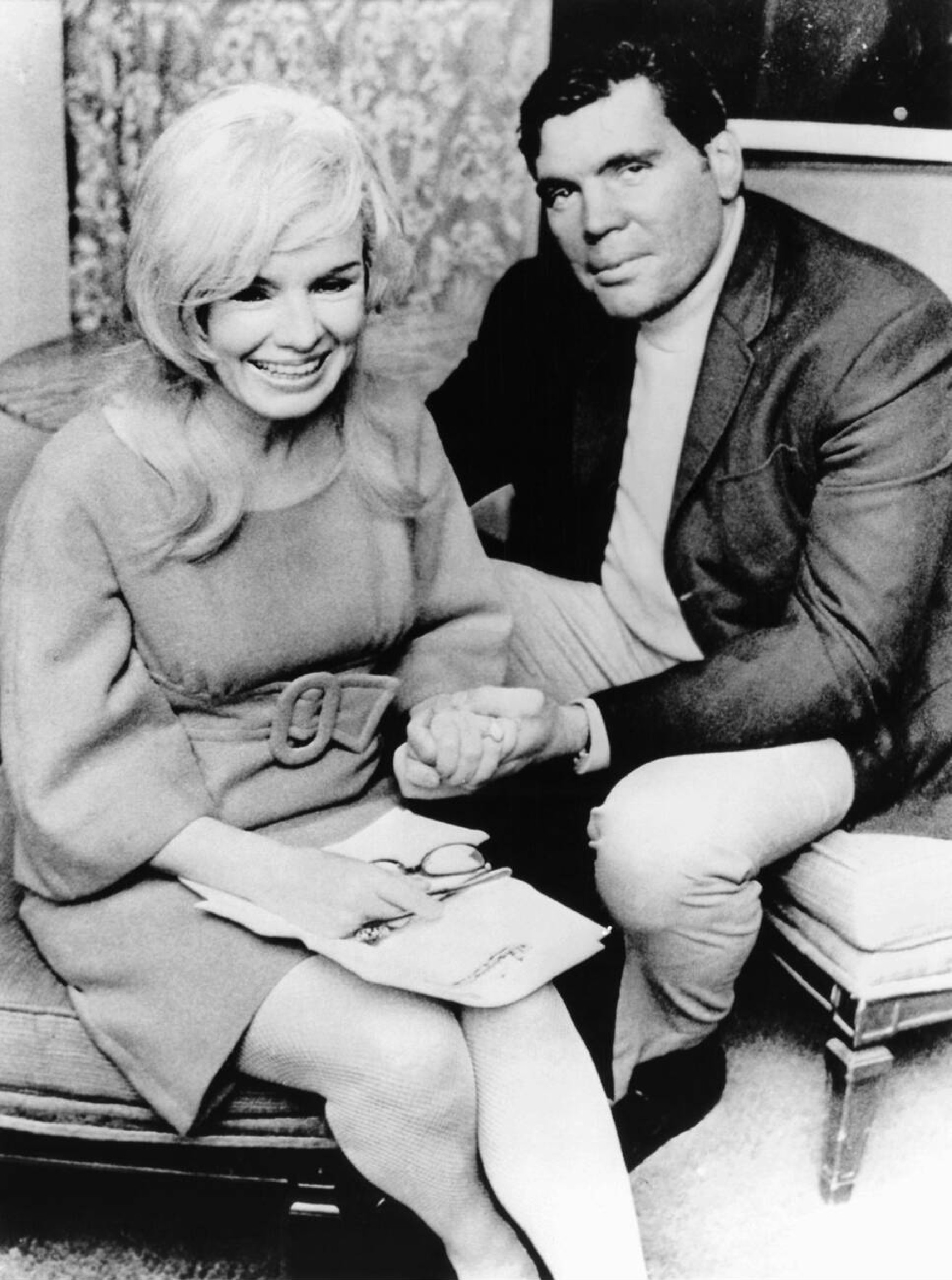
- Powers and Candy Mossler in 1967
- Born: January 13, 1942; Birmingham, Alabama, U.S.
- Died: October 8, 2010 (aged 68); Houston, Texas, U.S.
- Other names: Mel Powers
- Known for: Acquitted of the murder of Jacques Mossler

Melvin Lane Powers (January 13, 1942 – October 8, 2010) was an American businessman who was best known for his alleged role in the murder of Jacques Mossler, his uncle by marriage (husband of Candy Mossler, his mother's sister). Prosecutors claimed that Powers and Candy were lovers and that they had conspired to kill her husband in order to acquire his fortune. Attorney Percy Foreman was able to convince the jury to disregard the evidence presented against his client. Powers and his aunt were acquitted and no other persons were ever charged with the murder.

== Early life ==
Powers was born in 1942 in Birmingham, Alabama to Garrett "Ace" and Elizabeth Powers. He served in the United States Navy and worked in a number of jobs before he was convicted of a con job in Pontiac, Michigan and sentenced to serve 90 days in jail. He moved to Houston in 1961 while he was on probation. His mother suggested that he make contact with her sister, Candy Mossler, who lived there with her husband, who owned a number of financial companies.

== Romance and homicide ==
Based on documents and photographs provided by the prosecution in the murder case, Powers and his aunt had begun their incestuous romance in 1962. Her husband found out about the relationship a year later and threw Powers out of their home, having heard about the affair from his servants and then reading details about the relationship in his wife's diary. He was said to have considered divorcing his wife but was afraid of the negative publicity, and knew that under a prenuptial agreement that he had signed, his wife would get half of everything he owned.

After the couple separated, Candy Mossler gave Powers money to buy a mobile home business. Employees there testified under oath that Powers had made threats that he would kill Mr. Mossler, who was found dead on June 30, 1964. Candy Mossler returned from a hospital visit and found her husband's body wrapped in a blanket in his house in Key Biscayne, Florida, where he was dead after being bludgeoned and stabbed 39 times. Powers was arrested days after the murder.

== Murder trial ==
Candy Mossler and Powers were tried in March 1966 in what The New York Times described as "one of the most spectacular homicide trials ever" with the judge barring any spectators under the age of 21 from attending. Defense attorney Percy Foreman presented a theory that Mr. Mossler had been killed by a male lover, and convinced the jury to "disregard the whole wheelbarrow loads of manure that have been dumped from that witness stand." The evidence included a substantial array of materials and testimony showing that the two had been having an affair, a motive for the killing (Candy would have gotten only $200,000 if she had filed for divorce, but all of her husband's wealth if he died first). There was also evidence from the crime scene which purportedly connected Powers to the murder, and a diary entry written by Jacques Mossler that read, "If Mel and Candace don't kill me first, I'll have to kill them". Although the prosecution showed that Powers had been in Miami when the murder took place, introduced evidence of his fingerprints found in the apartment, and showed that Jacques Mossler's blood was in a car that matched one seen at the murder site, the jury accepted the defense's case and voted for acquittal. After the acquittal, Powers and Mossler kissed each other on the lips and drove off together in a gold Cadillac. No one else was ever charged with Mossler's murder.

== Later life ==
Powers and Candy Mossler lived together for a few years before separating. Candy Mossler later married Barnett Garrison, 19 years her junior. The year after they married, he suffered brain damage after a mysterious fall from their mansion's balcony. They later divorced.

Candy died at 56 of an overdose of medication in 1976. Mr. Powers attended her funeral accompanied (according to some newspapers, as reported in the New York Times) by “an attractive blonde.” By then, he had become a flamboyant real estate developer in Houston, favoring ostrich- and alligator-skin cowboy boots, owning an immense yacht and bobbing between riches and bankruptcy. By 1979, Powers had built a fortune estimated to be worth $200 million, which included a 142-foot (43 m)-long yacht the "Jan Pamela" to which he added a 23-foot (7.0 m) section that included a Jacuzzi and a mirrored ceiling.

Within a few years, Powers was facing financial difficulties, but was able to convince a judge that his 20,000-square-foot (1,900 m^{2}) penthouse atop one of the Arena Place towers was a protected homestead under Texas law. By 1983 he was bankrupt, but he was able to rebuild his fortune in real estate. Powers was found dead at the age of 68 on October 8, 2010, at his home in Houston.
