= Candy Mossler =

American socialite (1920–1976)

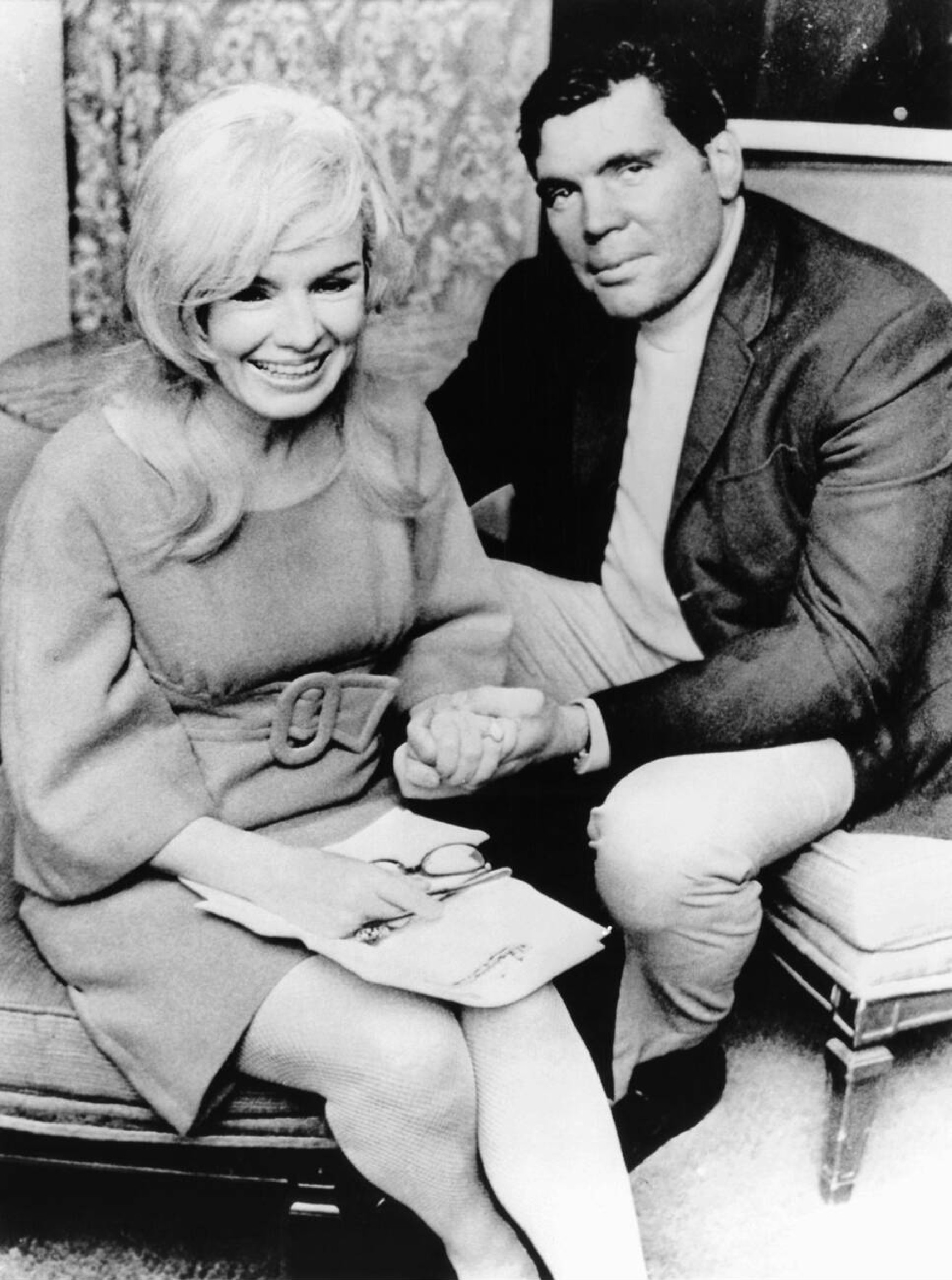
Mossler and Melvin Lane Powers in 1967

Candace Mossler (née Weatherby; February 18, 1920 – October 26, 1976), born in Buchanan, GA, was a socialite at the center of a sensational, highly publicized murder trial in the 1960s.

== Background ==
Candace Mossler and her nephew Melvin Lane Powers, with whom she was having an incestuous affair, were charged with (and found not guilty of) the killing of Mossler's millionaire husband, Jacques Mossler, in his Key Biscayne, Florida, condominium on June 29, 1964. Mossler and her husband were separated at the time of his murder. Jacques Mossler had considered suing Powers and divorcing his wife but, upon consultation with his lawyer, had decided against doing so in order to avoid the negative publicity and losing half of his fortune to his wife. At the time of her husband's murder, Mossler was on a $5,000 (worth approx. $49,000 in April 2023) a week stipend allocated for household upkeep.

During initial interviews with police officers, Candace Mossler asserted that she believed her husband's death was a result of a burglary gone wrong. However, when the officers stated they believed the murder was a crime of passion, noting that Jacques Mossler had been stabbed over thirty times before being bludgeoned over the head with a glass bowl, Mossler changed her story, saying that she believed that her husband had been a closeted homosexual, and had been cheating on her with another man who could have possibly committed the crime. As her husband had been found wearing only a bath robe, officers pursued this lead until they found Jacques Mossler's diary, which cast suspicion directly upon his wife and his nephew.

== Media coverage and trial ==
Candy Mossler was represented by a pair of Houston's best defense attorneys, Clyde Woody and Marian Rosen. Melvin Powers was defended by top-ranked Houston defense lawyers Percy Foreman and William F Walsh, the former a high-profile attorney who years later defended James Earl Ray, the man convicted for the assassination of Martin Luther King Jr. As the assets Mossler was set to inherit from her late husband were frozen at the time of her arrest pending the investigation of his death, Mossler paid Foreman's retainer with jewelry, diamonds, and furs that had been bought for her by her late husband before their separation.

Prior to her arrest, Mossler had flown to Rochester, Minnesota, to undergo treatment at the Mayo Clinic for migraines, When reporters confronted her with allegations of adultery, incest, and murder, she simply replied, "Well, nobody's perfect."

Mossler, a former model with platinum blond hair and a southern accent, was notable for her on-camera charm. While jail inmates shouted obscenities at her, she would smile and blow kisses at the cameras.

The courtroom was filled to maximum capacity with spectators every day of the murder trial. People brought their lunches with them and ate during court proceedings in order to retain their seats all day. The subject matter was considered so prurient that people under the age of 21 were turned away. During the course of their trial, lawyer Percy Foreman declined to call any witnesses to the stand, in direct contrast to the district attorney, who called a number of questionably relevant witnesses. Instead, Foreman emphasized his closing statement which, by many accounts, was extremely compelling. Both Mossler and Powers were acquitted.

Police officers and the district attorney's office declined to continue the search for Jacques Mossler's murderers afterwards, as they maintained their initial conclusion that Mossler and her lover had committed the crime. Eventually, Powers and Mossler drifted apart, and Mossler remarried.

In 1966, Mossler was the silent partner of her friend, singer Judy Garland, in Weatherby Records (titled after Mossler's maiden name), which Garland announced she would be recording for, along with signing other performers for. However, the venture never got off of the ground, in part due to adverse publicity when Mossler's involvement became known, and Garland signed a recording contract with ABC Records instead.

== Death ==
On October 26, 1976, Mossler died of an accidental overdose of a migraine medication in a Miami Beach, Florida hotel room. She was 56.

== In popular culture ==
The murder and subsequent trial was the subject of a 2014 episode of Investigation Discovery's series A Crime to Remember entitled “Candyland.” The case was also covered in a 2007 episode of Power, Privilege & Justice entitled “The Candy Scandal.”

== Trivia ==
In his autobiography Chuck Berry claimed to have had an affair with Candace Mossler while her husband was still alive. He dedicates a chapter to her.
