= David Althoff =

American war veteran (1932–2022)

David Althoff (May 5, 1932 – March 8, 2022) was an American veteran known for his heroic acts during the Vietnam War. David Althoff flew 1080 combat missions in Vietnam and lead over 700 men in his career.

Althoff enlisted in the United States Navy in November 1952 for the Korean War in fear of the draft. After completing 18 months of flight school and graduating in the top 10 percent of his class, David Alhoff was commissioned as a Marine Corps 2nd Lieutenant. In 1954, he was deployed to Korea and then transferred to Osugi, Japan after five months to join Marine Attack Squadron 251. In Osugi he underwent training to deliver atomic bombs and became one of eight qualified pilots for this task after 15 months in Osugi, Japan.

On February 21, 1968, he flew CH-46 helicopters to resupply the Khe Sanh Combat Base with water and ammo. During that time his aircraft suffered numerous hits from enemy's automatic weapons and mortars. On May 13, 1968, he was in charge of reconnaissance aircraft. During that time he landed both of them safely in a grassland, 200 metres (660 ft) away from mortar attacks. On July 3, 1968, he flew two Sea Knights back-to-back hovering over 1,500 feet (460 m) in an attempt to resupply the base.

He won multiple awards including "Aviator of the Year" in 1968, three silver stars, three Distinguished Flying Cross, a bronze star, and 54 air medals. He also received the Cunningham Award and was a developer of SuperGaggle. He reached the rank of Lieutenant Colonel before retiring in 1972.

Lt.Col. David Althoff died on March 8, 2022, at the age of 89 from leukemia.
