= Boeing 747 operational history =

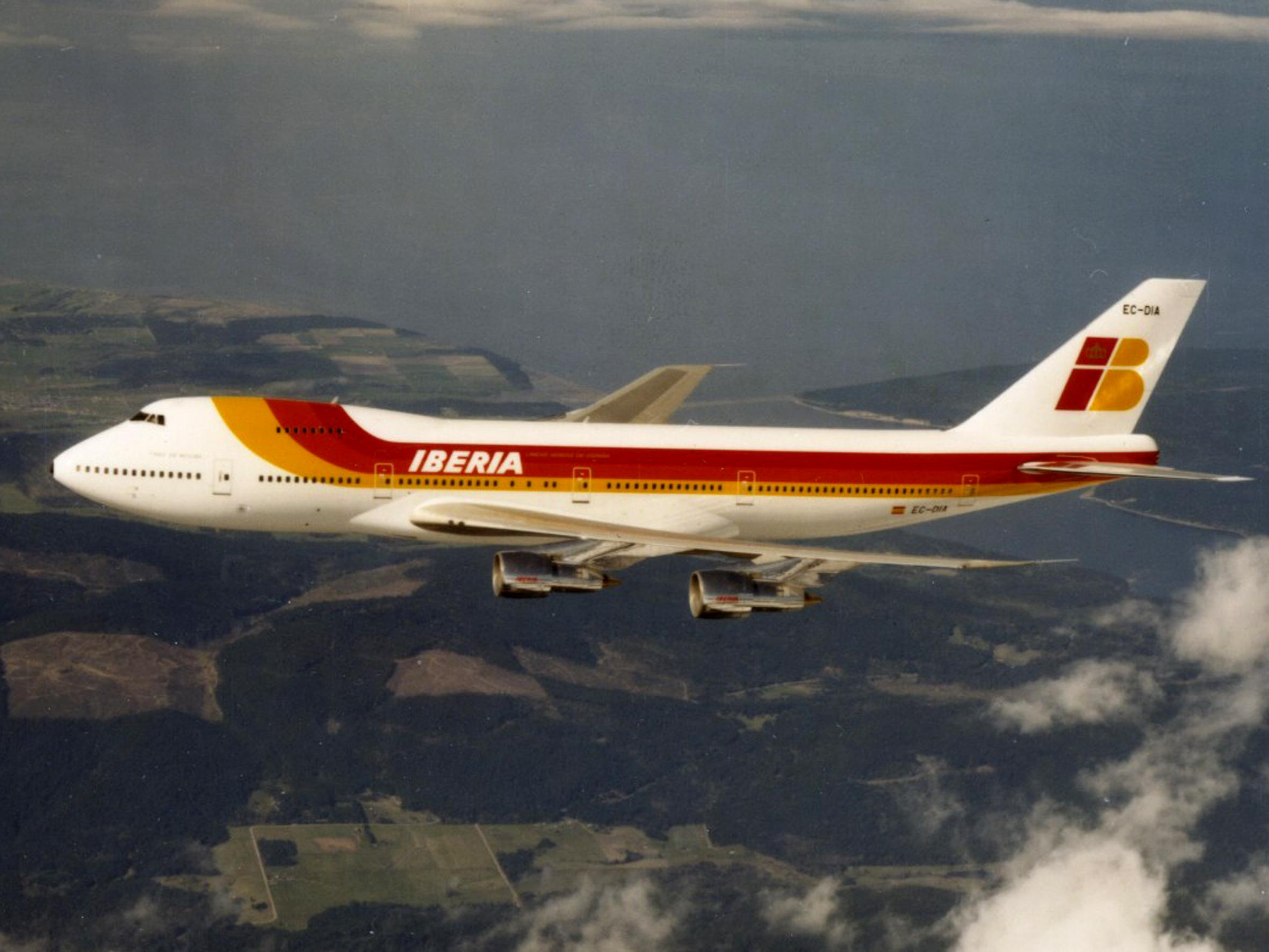
Boeing 747-200 operated by Iberia

The Boeing 747 has been in service with various commercial and government operators since its introduction in 1970. Historically, it was the primary long-haul aircraft of various airlines until changes in aircraft design trends and industry dynamics led to the gradual phase-out of 747 fleets in passenger operations. Today, the 747 is more commonly used by cargo airlines and government or military branches.

== Flight testing ==
=== Boeing flight test program ===
==== Certification test flights ====
The prototype 747, City of Everett (registration serial N7470), made its maiden flight on February 9, 1969, with test pilots Jack Waddell and Brien Wygle, along with flight engineer Jess Wallick, at the controls. The aircraft took off at 11:34 PST (UTC-8) from Paine Field and was flown over the Puget Sound. During this test flight, the City of Everett reached an altitude of 15,000 feet (4,600 m) and flew at a speed of up to 280 miles per hour (450 km/h) while carrying 60,000 pounds (27,000 kg) of instrumentation, as well as 1,000 pounds (450 kg) of water ballast for weight. The flight went as planned until the pilot of the Boeing-owned F-86 Sabre chase plane reported one of the inboard flap sections was misaligned when the crew tested the handling of the aircraft with full flaps (30 degrees), at which point the crew decided to return to Paine Field. After spending 1 hour and 26 minutes in the air, the City of Everett landed safely without further incident. In their evaluation of the maiden flight, the test pilots asserted that the 747's controls were light and well-balanced, enabling it to fly well on a gusty day with no turbulence, and they also determined that the 747 was immune to the Dutch roll, a phenomenon observed in earlier swept-wing aircraft.

Shortly after the first flight of the City of Everett, Boeing assembled the next four aircraft, which were all 747-100s destined for airline service, for use in the flight test program before delivery to their respective customers. These aircraft consisted of three 747-121s (Note: Until 2017, each airframe built by Boeing Commercial Airplanes, regardless of model, was designated with codes composed of two alphabetical characters or numeric digits after the variant designation to identify the original customer that ordered it (e.g. a 747-100 ordered by Pan Am would be designated 747-121). For more information, see List of Boeing customer codes.) (registration serials N747PA, N731PA, and N732PA) intended for Pan Am and one 747-131 (registration serial N93101) intended for Trans World Airlines (TWA). Production aircraft differed from the prototype by the installation of higher-thrust Pratt & Whitney JT9D-3A engines, whereas the prototype was equipped with the earlier JT9D-1.

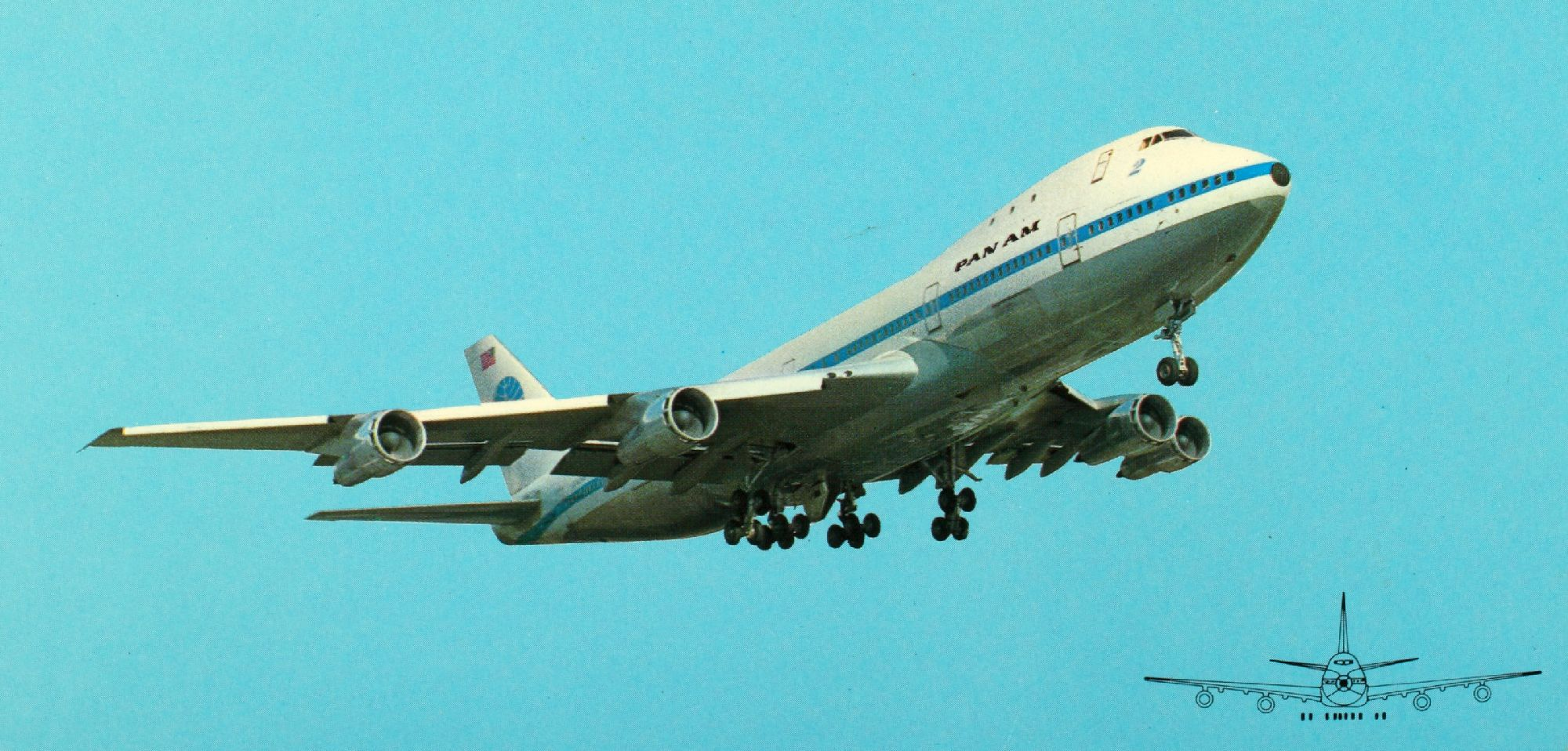
N747PA during its time as a test aircraft for Boeing.

N747PA, initially named Jet Clipper America, was the first production aircraft completed. It rolled out of Boeing's Everett plant on February 28, 1969, but did not fly until April 11. N731PA, named Clipper Bostonian, was rolled out 12 days after N747PA's first flight and joined the test program on May 10, while N732PA, named Clipper Storm King, was rolled out on May 16. The time between N732PA’s rollout and first flight was longer than that of its older sister ships due to the installation of a 32 feet (9.8 m) long pole on its nose for gust measurement. N732PA’s first flight was on July 10, three days before that of N93101, the sole TWA 747 in the test program. Boeing assigned N747PA for engines and systems testing, N731PA for structural tests, and N732PA and N93101 for service testing. In their flight test roles, N747PA, N731PA, N732PA, and N93101 were designated Ships 2, 3, 4, and 5, respectively. The City of Everett, which was designated Ship 1 or RA001, was used alongside these aircraft to probe the 747's basic aerodynamics and clear reported issues with flutter.

The test aircraft were pushed to their limits through extreme flight maneuvers, such as stalls and rejected takeoffs, to study the design's handling characteristics. The test aircraft flew at altitudes up to 45,000 feet (14,000 m), dived at speeds up to Mach 0.991, and took off at weights of up to 718,000 pounds (326,000 kg).

Unplanned system failures were experienced during the flight tests and sometimes caused damage to the test aircraft. One documented instance occurred on July 21, 1969, when N747PA came to a sudden stop after its automatic brakes failed while it was taxied out of its parking stall on Boeing Field. In an attempt to get the aircraft moving again, the crew applied more power to the engines, causing a nearby wheel-mounted shed to be blown by the jet blast and hit N731PA. The resulting damage to N731PA cost US$5,000.00 (US$43897.46 today) and injured four personnel on the ground.

The most serious accident in the flight test program occurred on December 13, 1969, when N732PA, flown by test pilot Ralph Cokely in strong crosswinds, undershot the runway at the Renton Municipal Airport, the site of the Boeing Renton Factory, causing it to crash land, tearing off the right outer landing gear and damaging the right wing's engine nacelles in the process.

On December 31, 1969, the Federal Aviation Administration (FAA) issued the 747's type certificate, clearing it for commercial service. By this time, the five test aircraft had flown 1,449 hours in 1,013 flights, including 539 hours for FAA demonstration flights.

==== Further testing ====
After the 747's introduction into commercial service in 1970, Boeing continued flight tests to improve the 747's design and address reported issues. In its first year of service, it was observed generating a significant amount of wake turbulence and posed a risk for smaller aircraft flying behind it, prompting the FAA to implement separation rules for aircraft flying close to 747s; the French government banned Pan Am from flying 747s into Paris during its first year of 747 service due to this concern. Boeing addressed these concerns in 1970 by conducting wake turbulence tests with a 737-100 flying closely behind a 747 at various distances to measure the wake generation of the larger aircraft, which Boeing found only to have a slight difference from the wake generated by the smaller 707 flown in the same test.

Boeing primarily focused on payload capabilities during the development and testing of the upgraded 747-200 and its subvariants throughout the 1970s. Weight trials were conducted between October and November of 1970 at Edwards Air Force Base with the prototype 747-200B, a 747-251B intended for Northwest Airlines, which reached a maximum takeoff weight of 820,700 pounds (372.3 t) during a test flight on November 12. At that time, the aircraft held the record for the heaviest takeoff weight until heavier and more powerful 747-200 airframes were built. On November 1, 1976, the first RB211-powered 747-200 set a world record for maximum mass lifted during a trial flight at NAS Lemoore, where it flew up to 6,562 feet (2,000 m) with a weight of 840,500 pounds (381.2 t).

== Passenger airlines ==
=== United States ===
==== Pan Am ====
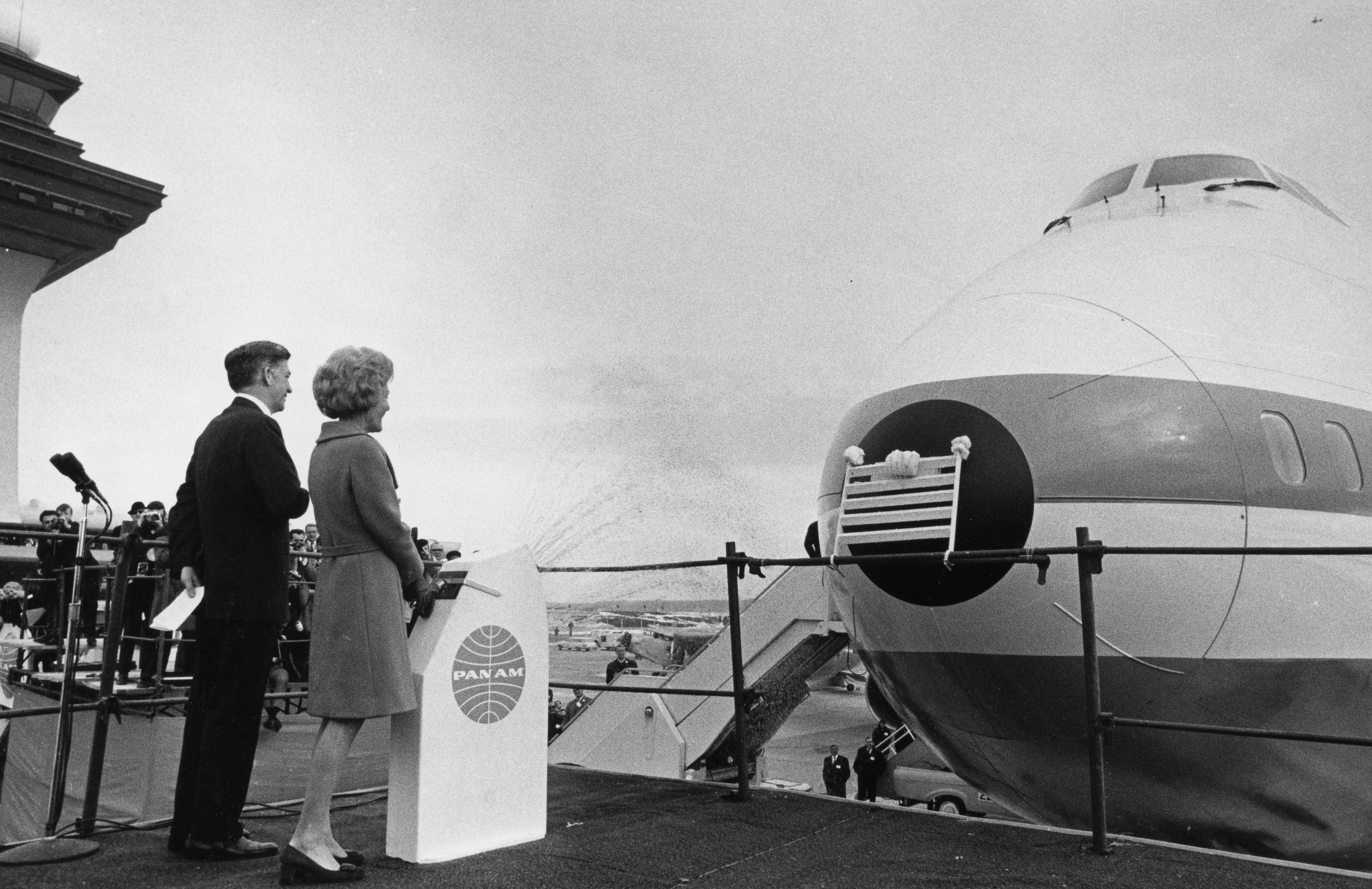
First Lady Pat Nixon christened the first commercial 747 on January 15, 1970.

From the outset, the 747 was designed based on Pan Am's need for an aircraft 2 1/2 times larger than the Boeing 707, the airline's primary long-haul aircraft in the 1960s. As the launch customer of the 747, Pan Am was heavily involved in the development of the 747 to an extent unmatched by a single airline before or since.

Pan Am announced its initial order for 25 747s on April 13, 1966. The first delivery of a 747 to an airline was made on December 12, 1969, when Pan Am received the airframe with registration serial N733PA, originally named Clipper Young America; this aircraft would later switch names with Clipper Constitution (registration serial N735PA) shortly before Pan Am's inaugural 747 service in January 1970. The first three production aircraft that had been assembled earlier in the year were intended for Pan Am but remained in Boeing's flight test program. The three test aircraft (registration serials N731PA, N732PA, N747PA) were eventually delivered between July and October 1970, much later than their younger sister ships.

On January 15, 1970, First Lady Pat Nixon christened Pan Am's first 747 at Dulles International Airport in the presence of Pan Am chairman Najeeb Halaby. Instead of champagne, red, white, and blue water was sprayed on the aircraft.

The 747 entered service on January 22, 1970, on Pan Am's New York–London route. The flight had been planned for the evening of January 21, but engine overheating made the original aircraft (Clipper Young America, registration N735PA) unusable. Finding a substitute delayed the flight by more than six hours to the following day when Clipper Victor (registration N736PA) was used. The 747 enjoyed a fairly smooth introduction into service, overcoming concerns that some airports would not be able to accommodate an aircraft that large. Although technical problems occurred, they were relatively minor and quickly solved.

Within the first year of service, Pan Am expanded its network of transatlantic 747 operations to various destinations in Europe, namely Amsterdam, Barcelona, Brussels, Frankfurt, Lisbon, Paris, and Rome, from hubs in New York and London's Heathrow Airport. Transpacific operations from Los Angeles and San Francisco to Honolulu, Hong Kong, and Tokyo were started once sufficient aircraft were delivered to sustain 747 operations on both the transatlantic and transpacific networks. The Los Angeles and San Francisco hubs were connected to London and Paris via polar routes, and Pan Am 747s also flew from Chicago to Frankfurt and London and from New York to San Juan. In recognition of its role in the development and introduction of the 747, Pan Am, along with Boeing and Pratt & Whitney, received the 1970 Collier Trophy, one of the highest honors in the aviation industry.

Beginning in November 1970, Pan Am 747-100s were sent back to the Boeing Everett Factory for refurbishment. The refurbished aircraft were equipped with higher-thrust variants of the Pratt & Whitney JT9D powerplant, specifically the standard JT9D-7/7A and the water-injected JT9D-3AW/7AW, which increased the maximum takeoff weight up to 755,000 pounds (342,000 kg) and provided an additional range of 460 nautical miles (850 km). The landing gear, flaps, fuel system, doors, and in-flight entertainment system were also upgraded in the refurbished specification. The upgraded aircraft were internally designated 747-100A within Pan Am to distinguish them from airframes still being operated with the original specifications.

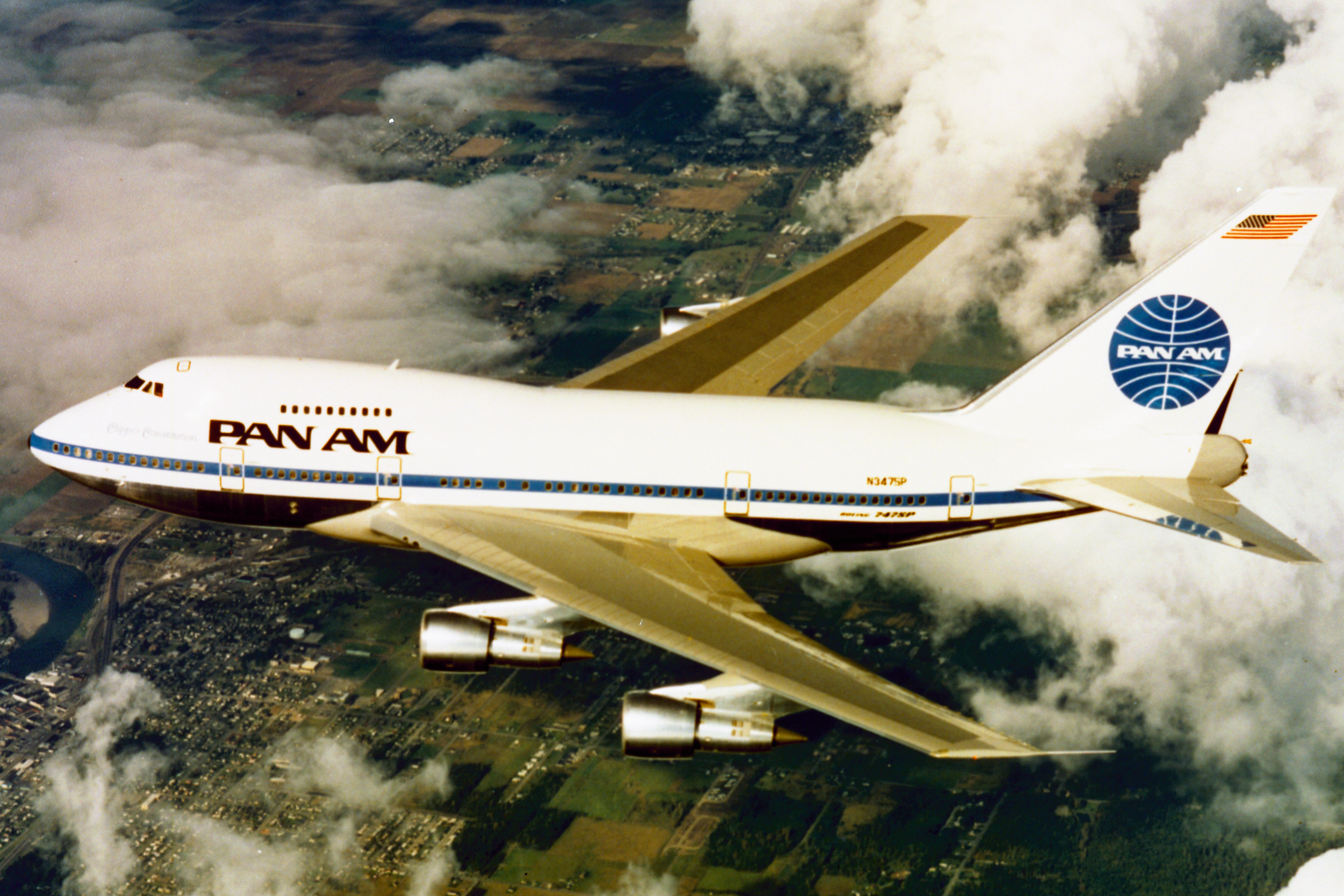
A Pan Am 747SP in flight in 1976. This particular airframe was one of the handful of Pan Am 747s that carried the name Clipper Constitution.

Despite having the longest range out of all commercial airliners in service by the mid-1970s, the performance of the engines on early models of the 747 limited their range. Hence, they could not fly nonstop on routes as long as 5,700 nautical miles (10,600 km). When Pan Am requested for an aircraft that could fly its New York–Tokyo route nonstop, Boeing responded by designing the 747SP (Special Performance), which featured higher-thrust engines and a fuselage 48 feet (15 m) shorter than that of the -100 and -200 variants. The SP received FAA certification on February 4, 1976, and was introduced by Pan Am on its New York–Tokyo route in April.

In October 1977, Pan Am commemorated its 50th anniversary by flying a 747SP, named Clipper New Horizons (registration serial N533PA), on a round-the-world trip that started and ended in San Francisco. The journey took a transpolar route to London, a flight across the African continent that landed in Cape Town, and a transpolar route across Antarctica to Auckland before its return to the United States. The journey covered 26,706 miles (42,979 km) in 56 hours and 7 minutes, which broke Pan Am's internal speed record for a round-the-world trip that was previously set 12 years earlier by a modified 707.

In December 1982, Pan Am made a deal with Flying Tiger Line to trade four of the former's converted freighter 747-100s in exchange for three of the latter's passenger-carrying 747-200s that had previously been operated by Singapore Airlines. Pan Am received two of the three ex-Flying Tigers 747-200s on February 24, 1983, while the third aircraft was subsequently transferred to Pan Am's fleet on March 25. The titles for ownership of the traded aircraft were exchanged by the beginning of March.

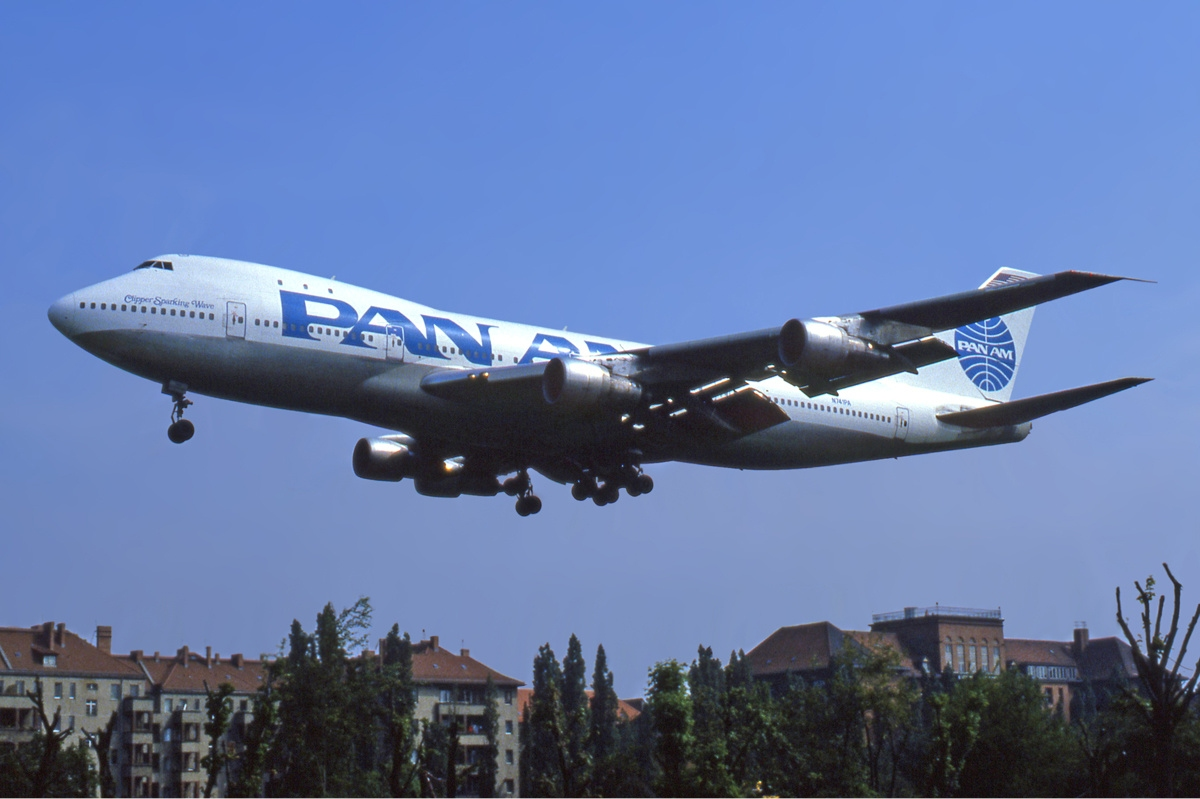
Clipper Sparking Wave, a 747-100, landing at Berlin Tempelhof Airport in 1987. The aircraft is shown wearing Pan Am's final "Billboard" livery.

As the launch customer of the original 747, Pan Am was synonymous with the 747 and kept most of its 747s in service throughout its last years. However, the airline's large order for 747s in 1966 has been attributed as a cause of its financial losses that began in 1969, when the airline lost US$26.42M (US$231.95M today). The airline continued to lose millions in profits for the next five years due to decreased demand for international travel and increased operating costs brought about by the 1973 oil crisis. As Pan Am's financial loses continued into the 1980s, the airline sold its transpacific network and its fleet of 747SPs to United Airlines in 1985. The continuous financial losses since the 1970s eventually led to Pan Am filing for bankruptcy protection in January 1991 before ceasing operations months later in December.

The second aircraft off the production line, N747PA (by then renamed Clipper Juan T. Trippe in honor of Pan Am's founder), was the last 747 still wearing Pan Am's livery when it left the airline's former hub at New York's John F. Kennedy International Airport for storage in San Bernardino, California, on May 13, 1992. 70 ex-Pan Am employees gathered at JFK Airport to sign the aircraft before witnessing its departure at 9:50 AM local time. Prior to its takeoff, the aircraft received a water salute from airport fire trucks.

By the time Pan Am ceased operations in 1991, the airline had suffered four 747 hull losses. The first of these occurred on September 6, 1970, when Clipper Fortune (registration serial N752PA), operating as Pan Am Flight 93 from Amsterdam to New York, was hijacked by terrorists involved in the Dawson's Field hijackings and subsequently bombed without loss of life when the aircraft arrived in Cairo. On March 27, 1977, Clipper Victor, operating as Pan Am Flight 1736, was destroyed in the Tenerife airport disaster after a collision with a departing KLM 747-206B on the runway of Los Rodeos Airport in heavy fog, killing 335 of the 396 occupants onboard Flight 1736; the disaster was the deadliest in aviation history with a total of 583 fatalities.

==== Other U.S. operators ====
A 747-100 of TWA, one of Pan Am's primary competitors on transatlantic routes.

After the 747's introduction with launch customer Pan Am in 1970, other airlines that had bought the 747 to stay competitive began to put their own 747s into service. Within months after the inaugural 747 service, Pan Am faced competition on international routes from other US-based carriers, specifically Trans World Airlines (TWA) on transatlantic routes and Northwest Airlines (Note: Operated as Northwest Orient until the merger with Republic Airlines on August 12, 1986.) on transpacific routes. TWA initially commenced 747 operations on its domestic network with a New York–Los Angeles service before placing the type into service on its New York–London route in March 1970, while Northwest commenced 747 services between New York, Chicago, Seattle, and Tokyo that same year in July.

Within the United States, the 747 was introduced on domestic routes. American Airlines introduced the 747-100 on the New York–Los Angeles route in March 1970, using aircraft leased from Pan Am, as American's own 747 fleet was not delivered from Boeing until later in the year. Braniff International, Continental Airlines, Delta Airlines, Eastern Airlines, National Airlines, and United Airlines soon inaugurated their own domestic services with 747s between 1970 and 1971.

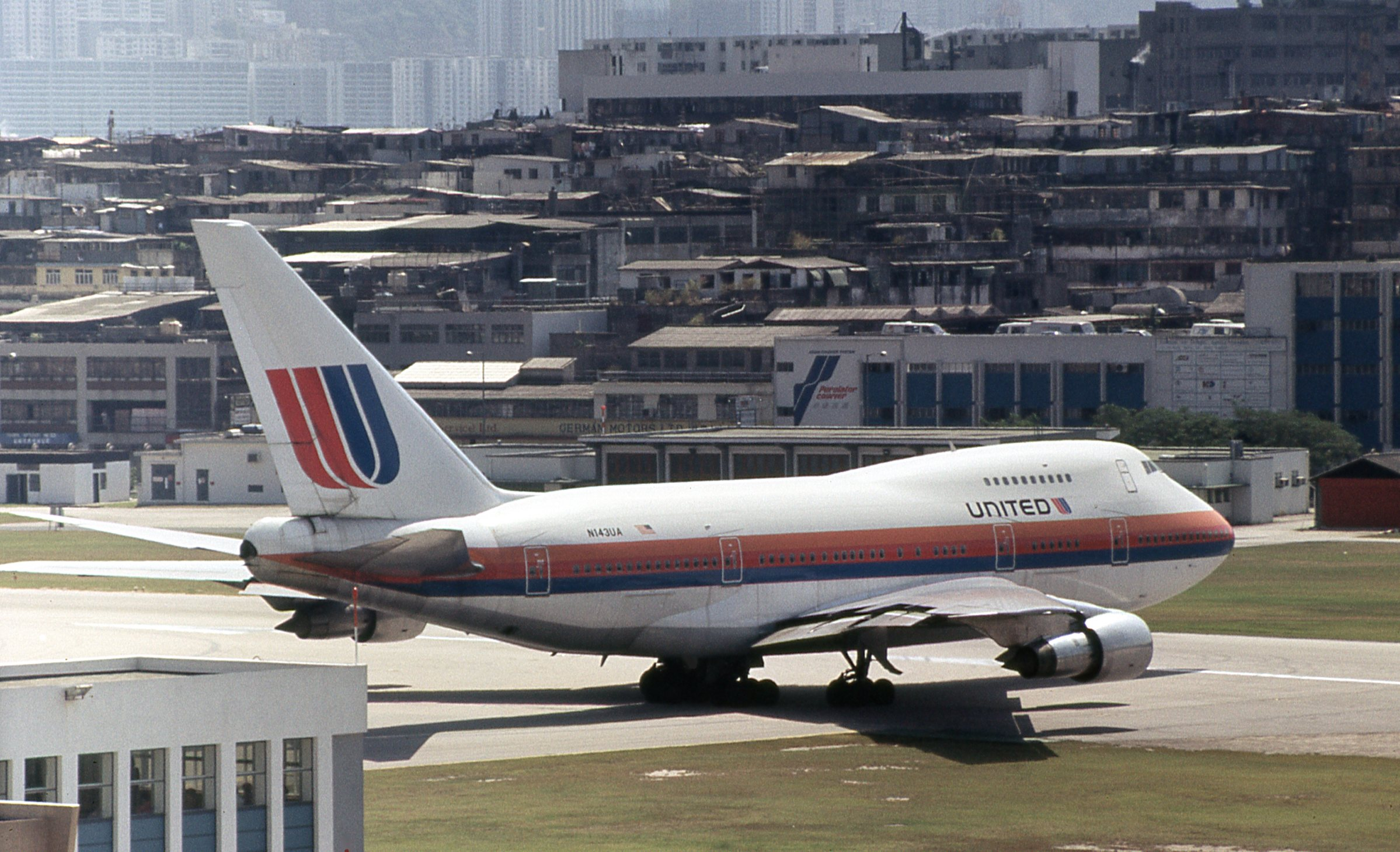
747SP of United Airlines at Hong Kong's Kai Tak Airport. United purchased Pan Am's 747SPs along with the latter's Pacific network in 1985.

Boeing estimated that half of the early 747 sales were to airlines desiring the aircraft's long range rather than its payload capacity. While the 747 had the lowest potential operating cost per seat, this could only be achieved when the aircraft was fully loaded; costs per seat increased rapidly as occupancy declined. A moderately loaded 747, one with only 70 percent of its seats occupied, used more than 95 percent of the fuel needed by a fully occupied 747. Nonetheless, many flag-carriers purchased the 747 due to its prestige, "even if it made no sense economically" to operate. During the 1970s and 1980s, over 30 regularly scheduled 747s could often be seen at John F. Kennedy International Airport.

The recession of 1969–1970, despite having been characterized as relatively mild, greatly affected Boeing. For almost three years after 1970, yearly orders for the 747 went down to seven in 1971, the production rate dropped to one aircraft a month, and no American carriers filed any new orders. When economic problems in the US and other countries after the 1973 oil crisis led to reduced passenger traffic, several airlines found they did not have enough passengers to fly the 747 economically, and they replaced them with the smaller and recently introduced McDonnell Douglas DC-10 and Lockheed L-1011 TriStar trijet wide bodies (and later the 767 and Airbus A300/A310 twinjets). Having tried replacing coach seats on its 747s with piano bars in an attempt to attract more customers, American Airlines eventually relegated its 747s to cargo service and, in 1983, exchanged them with Pan Am for smaller aircraft. Continental Airlines and Delta Airlines also removed their 747-100s from service not long after their introduction and replaced them with DC-10s and L-1011s, respectively, but both airlines would later reacquire 747s and continue operating them through mergers with other carriers. Continental operated the 747-100 again and also acquired secondhand examples of the improved 747-200 after merging with PEOPLExpress in 1987, while Delta acquired the 747-400 fleet of Northwest as part of their merger in 2008, although Delta retired the -400s in December 2017.

Among all the US-based carriers that ordered the 747 when it was launched, only Northwest, Pan Am, TWA, and United maintained a consistent streak of 747 operations by the end of the 1980s, primarily utilizing their fleets on international routes. Braniff International declared bankruptcy and officially ceased operations on May 12, 1982, but the airline's last service, flown by one of its Big Orange 747s from Honolulu, arrived at Dallas-Fort Worth Airport, Braniff's former hub, the following day. TWA and Northwest both operated 747s while complementing their fleets with smaller L-1011s and DC-10s, respectively; in 1984, Northwest acquired two 747-200Bs originally intended for Braniff that had been left undelivered at Boeing's Wichita plant since the latter airline's dissolution in 1982. United expanded its 747 routes internationally by launching a service to Tokyo in 1983 and acquiring Pan Am's Pacific division, along with the latter's fleet of 747SPs, in 1985.

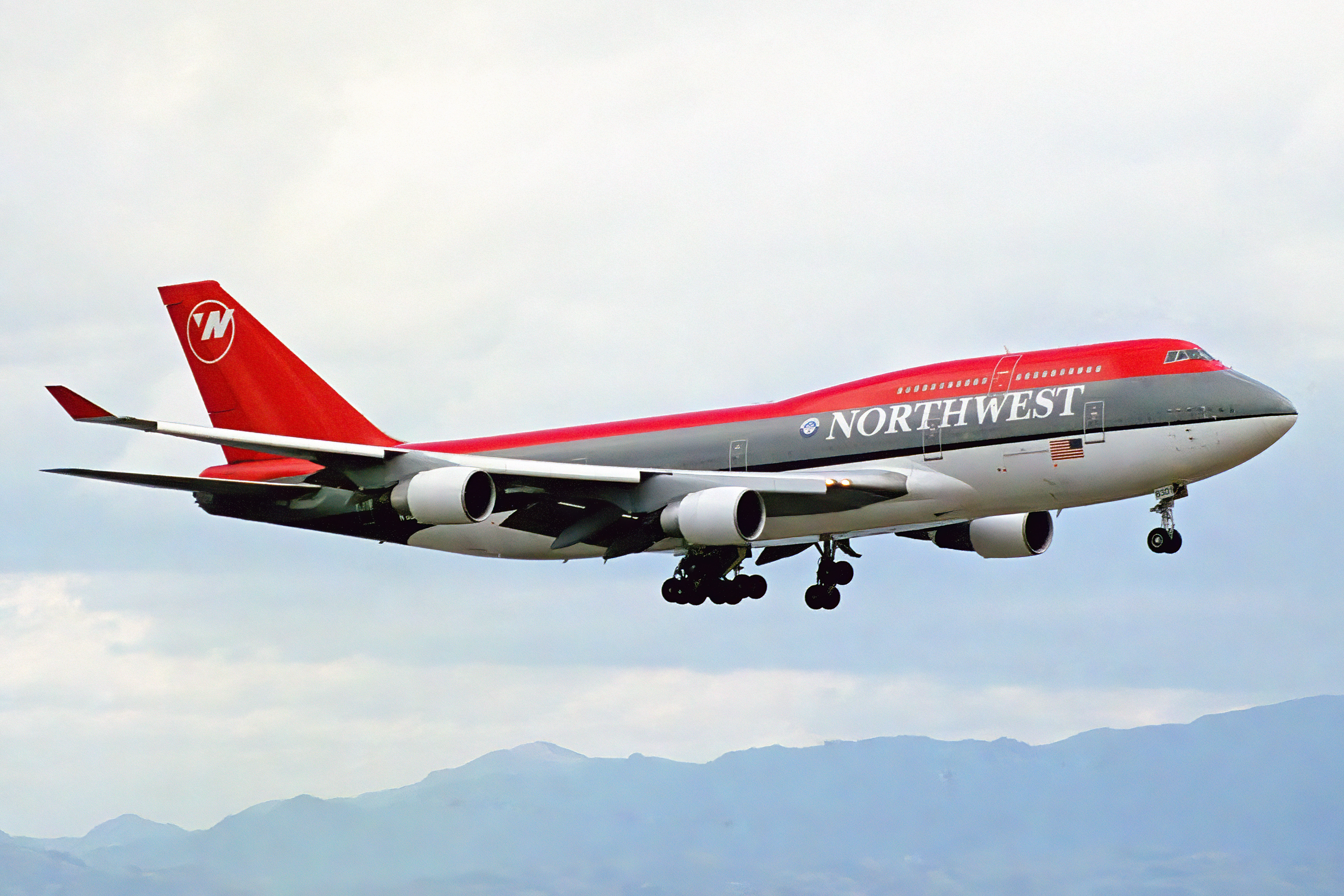
Northwest Airlines introduced the improved 747-400 in 1989. Seen here is the prototype aircraft, N661US.

When the 747-400 was launched in 1985, Northwest Airlines and United Airlines were the only American customers for its initial passenger variant. Northwest was the launch customer of the 747-400 and had been one of the airlines consulted by Boeing to provide inputs on the aircraft's design. It received its first -400 on January 26, 1989, and initially deployed the new variant on its domestic network, specifically the Minneapolis–Phoenix route, for crew familiarization prior to inaugurating its first international -400 service on the New York–Tokyo route. United followed in introducing the -400 after receiving its first aircraft in June 1989.

From the 1990s onwards, the 747-400 began replacing 747 Classics as the primary long-haul aircraft in the fleets of Northwest and United. Northwest relegated some of its older Classic airframes, specifically the -100s, to supporting the airline's DC-10s on its transatlantic network, but the -200s continued to be used alongside the -400s on transpacific routes.

=== Japan ===
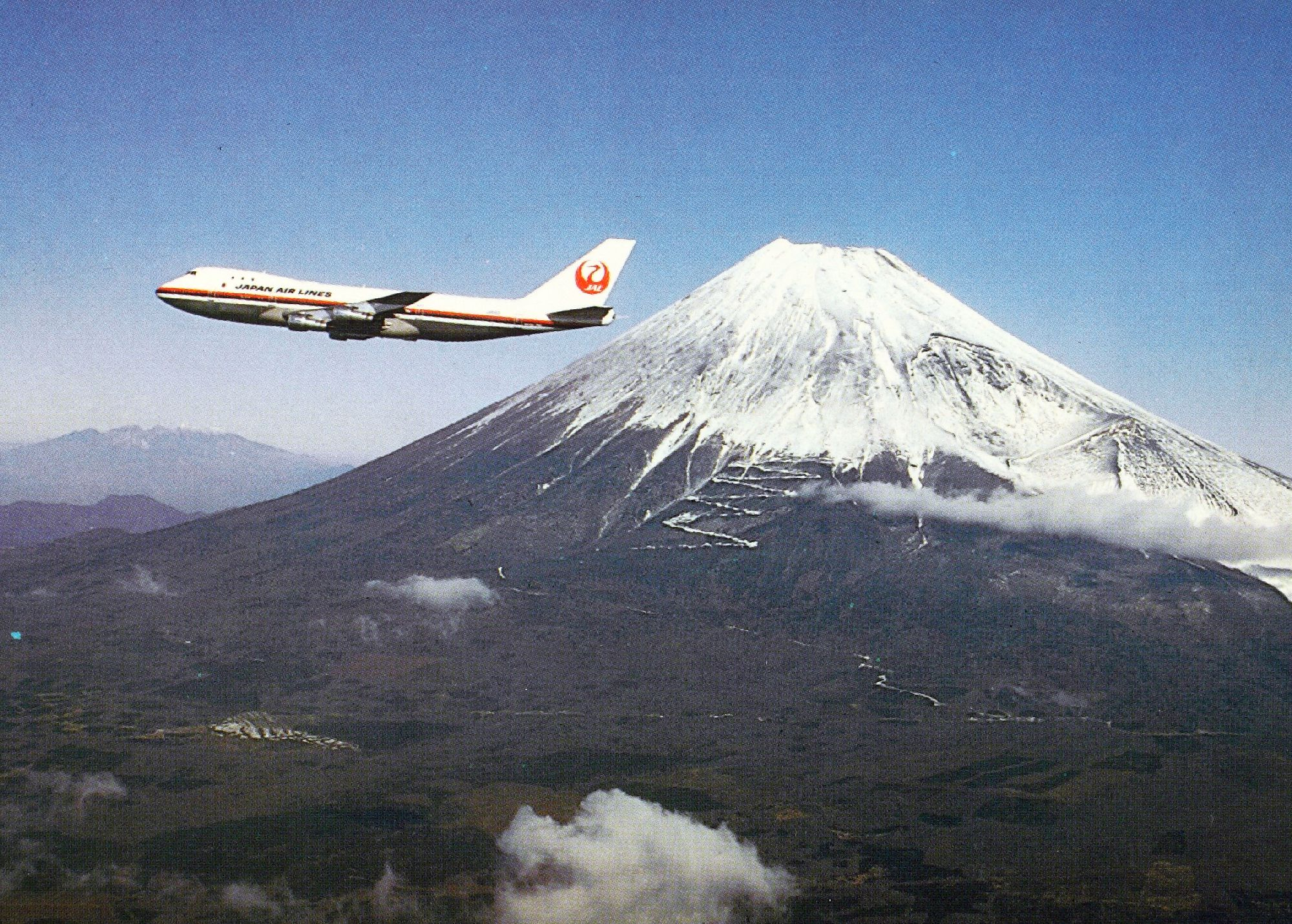
747 Classic of Japan Airlines, the type's all-time largest operator, over Mount Fuji, c. 1970s.

Japan was one of the markets Boeing specifically catered to while developing the 747. Boeing notably consulted engineers from Japan Airlines (JAL) on the 747's design, and it also developed short-range 747 models to address the growing demand for domestic air travel within Japan from the 1970s to the 1990s.

JAL was the 747's all-time largest operator, operating a total of 115 aircraft from 1970 to 2011. It received its first 747-100 on April 22, 1970, and commenced operations with it in June 1970 on routes from Tokyo to Hong Kong, Honolulu, and Los Angeles, making it the first Asian operator of the 747. Upon its introduction, JAL's sales representatives expressed enthusiasm for the 747 by sending a banner written in Japanese as a gift to Boeing's Everett factory.

JAL operated every variant of the 747 except the SP and -8. Despite attempts from Boeing sales representatives in the mid-1970s to sell the shortened 747SP to JAL as a complement for its full-sized 747s, even going as far as taking JAL representatives on board a demonstrator aircraft on a flight from New York to Tokyo, JAL rejected it in favor of the DC-10, citing the SP as too big for its needs. It did, however, continue to utilize 747-100s, -200s, and -300s as its primary long-haul aircraft of the 1970s and 1980s and even fitted extra fuel tanks on some of its 747-200Bs for use on the nonstop Executive Express Tokyo–New York service. On January 26, 1990, JAL received its first 747-400, which was crewed by two pilots instead of the three-person crew (2 pilots, 1 flight engineer) required by older variants and eliminated the need for stopovers on other international routes.

From 1979 to 2014, All Nippon Airways (ANA), JAL's primary competitor in Japan, operated the 747SR, -200B, and -400/400D variants, In contrast to JAL, ANA focused purely on domestic routes in its early years of 747 operations and, despite having charter routes to other Asian countries since the 1970s, did not commence scheduled international services until introducing the 747-200 in July 1986 to inaugurate its new routes from Tokyo's Narita International Airport to Los Angeles and Washington, D.C. The airline later set a world record for the continuous operation of a single engine when an engine on one of its 747-200s, first installed on the aircraft in 1989, accumulated a total of 28,888 flight hours within a period of 6 and a half years. ANA introduced the 747-400 in November 1990 as a replacement for its 747 Classics and operated it in both the basic long-haul variant and the short-haul 747-400D until 2014.

In their publications, ANA and JAL both referred to long-haul passenger-carrying models of the 747 Classic generation (i.e. 747-100/200/300) as the 747LR (Long Range) for consistency with the designation of their short-range 747SRs, although they still referred to the newer 747-400 by its original Boeing designation.

==== Domestic variants ====
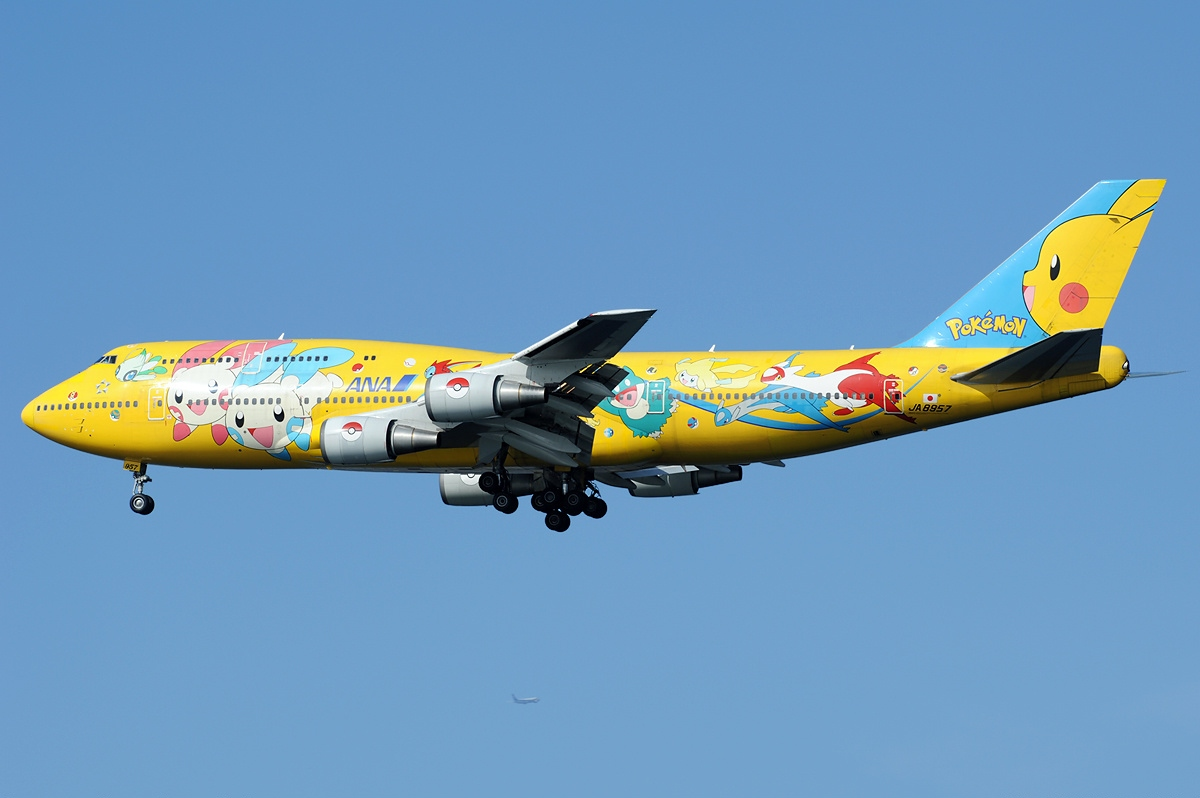
An All Nippon Airways 747-400D painted in a Pokémon-themed special livery.

747s specially designed for short-haul operations were offered to JAL and ANA as a response to the rapid growth of Japanese domestic traffic in the late 1960s, which had reached an average domestic load factor of 85% by 1970 and could not be efficiently addressed by the airlines' existing fleet of smaller Boeing 727s and Douglas DC-8s. Ordering more of the smaller 727s would have exacerbated airport congestion, hence the suggestion from Boeing's sales representatives for the two airlines to utilize 747s on their domestic routes, as one 747 took up less terminal frontage than two 727-200s combined. The original short-haul variant, a 747-100 derivative designated 747SR, (Note: Alternatively known as the 747SR-100 or 747-100SR.) was initially configured to carry about 460 passengers until later versions increased this to 550, close to the maximum passenger capacity the 747 was originally designed for.

The 747SR entered service on September 26, 1973, with JAL, which later operated stretched upper deck (SUD) variants of the SR that were designated -100BSR SUD (Note: Alternatively known as the 747-100SUD.) and -300SR. The SR remained in service with JAL until the retirement of the -100BSR SUDs on November 30, 2006.

ANA received its first 747SR on December 21, 1978, and put it into service on January 25, 1979, on the airline's routes from Tokyo's Haneda Airport to Fukuoka and Sapporo. The SR was the largest aircraft in ANA's domestic network until the introduction of its replacement, the 747-400D, in the 1990s. The Classic series SR was subsequently retired from ANA's fleet in March 2006.

The 747-400D was developed as a modernized version of the original SR based on the 747-400. The first -400D made its maiden flight in March 1991 and was delivered to JAL the following October. By 1997, 20 -400Ds had been delivered to ANA and JAL.

=== Other operators ===
==== 747 Classic ====
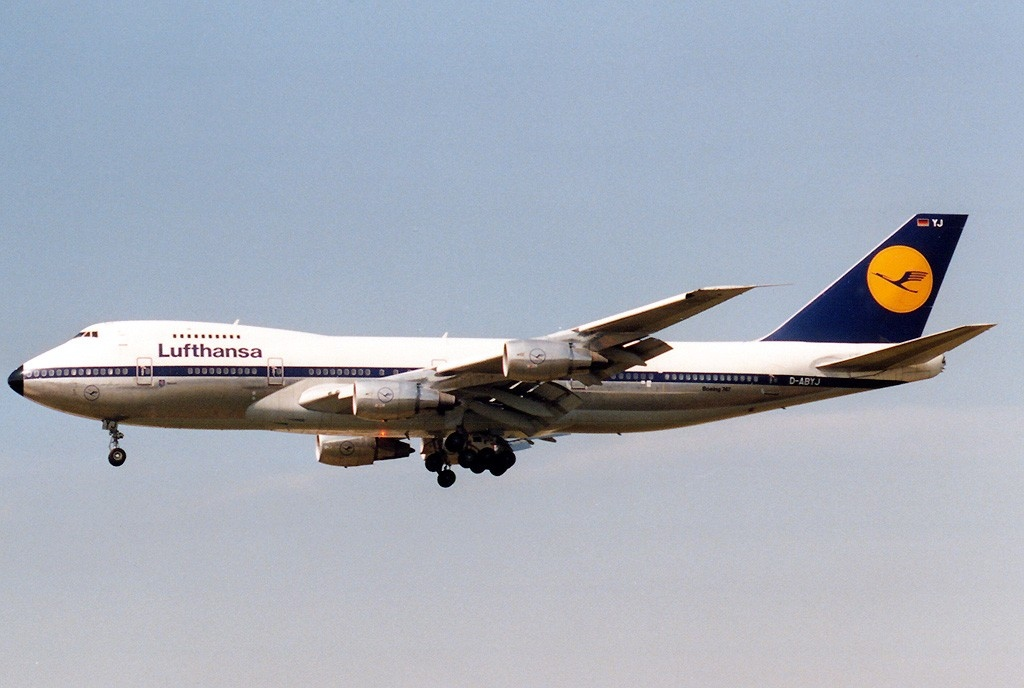
747-200 of Lufthansa. Lufthansa was both the first non-American operator of the 747 and the first 747 Freighter operator worldwide

The 747 saw the most success as the primary long-haul aircraft for airlines operating in Europe and the Asia-Pacific region, where it had been introduced by airlines based in those regions within its first year of service in 1970. Lufthansa became the first European operator of the 747 and the first carrier outside the United States to inaugurate 747 services when its first 747-100 was delivered on March 10, 1970, and entered service on the Frankfurt–New York route the following month, replacing the smaller 707s that it previously used on the route. Together with Air France and JAL, Lufthansa was among Pan Am's primary non-U.S. competitors within the first year of 747 operations in 1970.

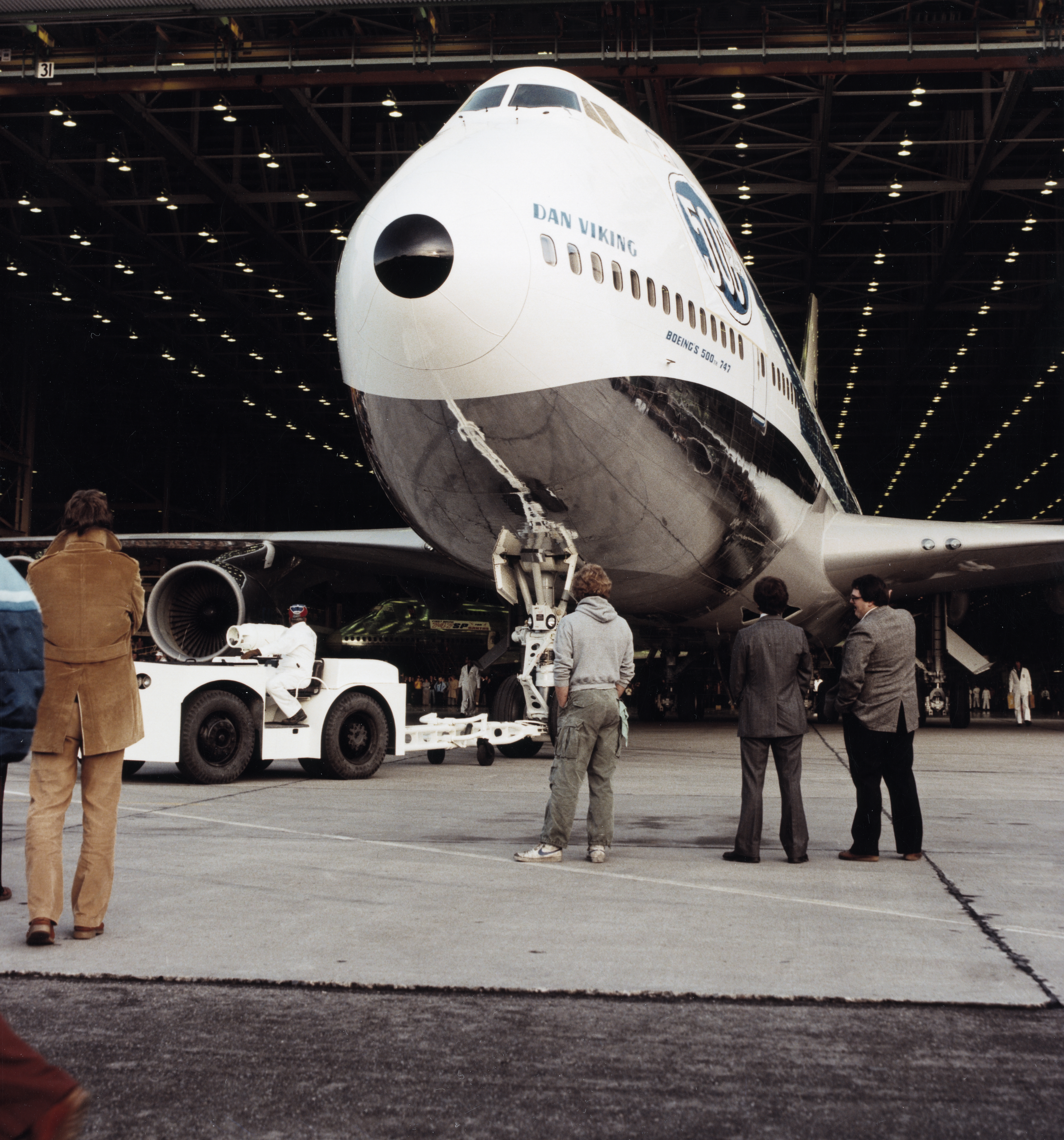
Roll-out of the 500th 747 built, a 747-200M for Scandinavian Airlines named Dan Viking, in November 1980

By 1971, more airlines worldwide were operating 747s. European carriers like Aer Lingus, British Overseas Airways Corporation (BOAC), (Note: Predecessor of British Airways.) and Sabena, had acquired their own fleets of 747-100s, and other European airlines that had previously not purchased any Boeing aircraft, such as Alitalia, KLM, and Scandinavian Airlines (SAS), (Note: The acronym stood for the airline's full corporate name, Scandinavian Airlines System.) chose the 747 as their first widebody aircraft to remain competitive on long-haul routes. That same year, Air India became the second Asian operator of the 747 through its acquisition of 747-200s as replacements for its older 707s on the airline's routes to London and New York, while El Al became the first Middle Eastern operator of the 747, also through introducing the 747-200.

Prior to the 747's introduction in 1970, two maintenance and supply chain consortiums were formed between European 747 operators in the late 1960s to share training programs, work allocation, and cost saving between operators. Air France, Alitalia, Lufthansa, Iberia, and Sabena made up the ATLAS group, while KLM, SAS, Swissair, and Union de Transports Aériens (UTA) formed the KSSU consortium in 1968. Lufthansa was among the airlines Boeing consulted for technical advice early in the 747's development, and it, along with fellow ATLAS members Air France and Alitalia, also provided feedback to Boeing regarding the performance issues of early JT9D engines. KSSU's members provided Boeing with technical advice on the development of the 747 and had a significant influence over the design of the 747-200 variant, which was externally identical to the earlier 747-100 but distinguished internally by its more powerful engines and increased fuel capacity. The 747-200, initially known as the 747B, was introduced by KLM in February 1971 on its Amsterdam–New York route.

A notable trend among European operators was the usage of Combi aircraft, which could simultaneously carry freight and passengers on the main deck. The Combi configuration was first developed in 1974 as a conversion for Sabena's pair of passenger-carrying 747-100s when the airline needed extra freight capacity to accommodate heavy freight traffic and compensate for low passenger demand on its North Atlantic routes. Not long after Sabena's 747s re-entered service, the Combi configuration attracted the attention of other European airlines, and KLM became one of the first airlines to file orders for new-build Combi 747s, the first of which was delivered to the airline in October 1975. By the 1980s, Combi 747s, in the form of the -200M and -300M variants, were also operated in Europe by airlines like Air France, Alitalia, Iberia, Lufthansa, SAS, Swissair, and UTA. In other parts of the world, Boeing delivered -200Ms to operators like Air Canada, Air Gabon, Air Madagascar, Alia Royal Jordanian Airlines, Cameroon Airlines, China Airlines, Kuwait Airways, Middle East Airlines, Pakistan International Airlines, and Varig; Air Canada was the launch customer of factory-built 747 Combis and received its first 747-200M on March 7, 1975. Combi aircraft appealed to some airlines from the 1970s to 1990s due to having almost the same passenger capacity as the smaller DC-10 and L-1011 widebodies, ideal for transatlantic routes where passenger traffic was often insufficient to fill a 747, while also carrying approximately the same freight load of two 707s, the primary long-haul freighter of most airlines prior to the introduction of freighter and Combi 747 variants, thereby sustaining profitable operations.

Efforts to increase the 747's range and minimize the need for refueling stops were initially achieved by the development of the shorter and lighter 747SP, which could fly up to 5,700 nautical miles (10,600 km) and carry 281 passengers in a standard mixed-class cabin layout. However, the SP's popularity among airlines began to wane not long after its introduction in 1976 due to increased passenger traffic on the long-haul routes it had originally been designed for, which led to airlines instead ordering the 747-200, by then upgraded with extra fuel tanks and higher-thrust engines that enabled it to match the SP's range. As a result, only 45 SPs were produced in total, the last of which was delivered as a VIP transport for the government of the United Arab Emirates in 1987.

Long-range models of the 747-100 were gradually replaced in the production line by the 747-200 but continued to be sold until the 1980s. The last -100 built to the original specifications of the prototype was delivered to Air France on February 25, 1976, while the -100B, a structurally upgraded subvariant of the -100 with the stronger airframe and landing gear design of the 747SR, was produced for its only customers, Iran Air and Saudia, from 1979 to 1982. Saudia received 9 -100Bs between April 24, 1981, and April 2, 1982, while Iran Air received only one aircraft on August 2, 1979, shortly before U.S. sanctions imposed on Iran after the 1979 Iranian Revolution prevented Boeing from delivering additional aircraft for Iranian operators, including three unbuilt -100Bs Iran Air had ordered.

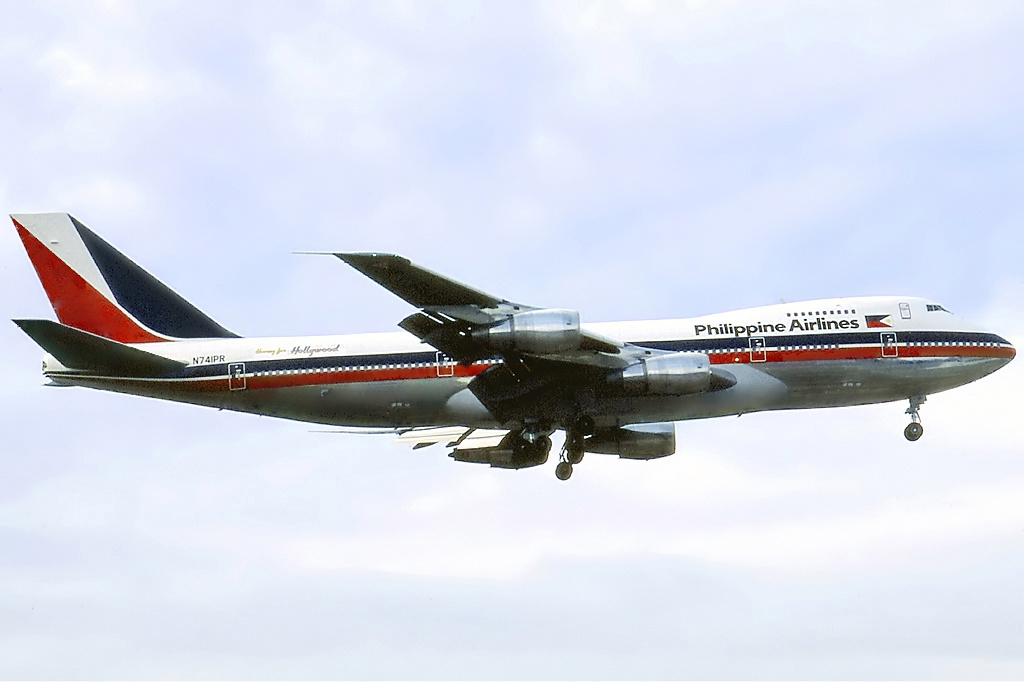
Philippine Airlines was among the last airlines to utilize the 747's upper deck for purposes other than conventional passenger seating and notably placed beds on the upper decks of its first four 747-200Bs delivered between 1979 and 1980.

European operators of the 747 primarily deployed their aircraft on transatlantic routes to the American continent, as well as on services to Africa, the Middle East, and the Asia-Pacific region. Many other international carriers used the 747 on Pacific routes. Due to the range limitations of early 747 models in the 1970s and 1980s, transpacific flights between the Asia-Pacific region and the American continent typically stopped in island territories and cities like Honolulu and Guam for refueling.

Global politics sometimes influenced the routes flown by operators, with a notable example being polar routes via Anchorage that aimed to connect the Asia-Pacific region to the East Coast of the United States and Europe without flying through Soviet airspace, which was then restricted for Western Bloc carriers during the Cold War. Despite these efforts, a Soviet Air Force Sukhoi Su-15 shot down Korean Air Lines Flight 007, a flight from New York to Seoul operated by a 747-230B (Note: The aircraft involved was originally manufactured for and delivered to Condor, hence it was not designated with the B5 customer code for Boeing aircraft directly sold to Korean Air Lines (later known as Korean Air).) (registration serial HL7442), on September 1, 1983, when the 747 unintentionally strayed into Soviet territory due to improper configuration of the aircraft's inertial navigation system (INS) for the Anchorage–Seoul leg of the flight. This led to the temporary closure of the air route the incident flight had been using and the widespread installation of GPS on commercial aircraft to prevent such an incident from occurring again. With the collapse of the Soviet Union in 1991 and the development of the longer-range 747-400, most airlines saw no need for stopovers in Anchorage and promptly discontinued such flights once longer-range aircraft were acquired from the 1990s onwards, although China Airlines continued using Anchorage as a stopover for its Taipei–New York route until 2011.

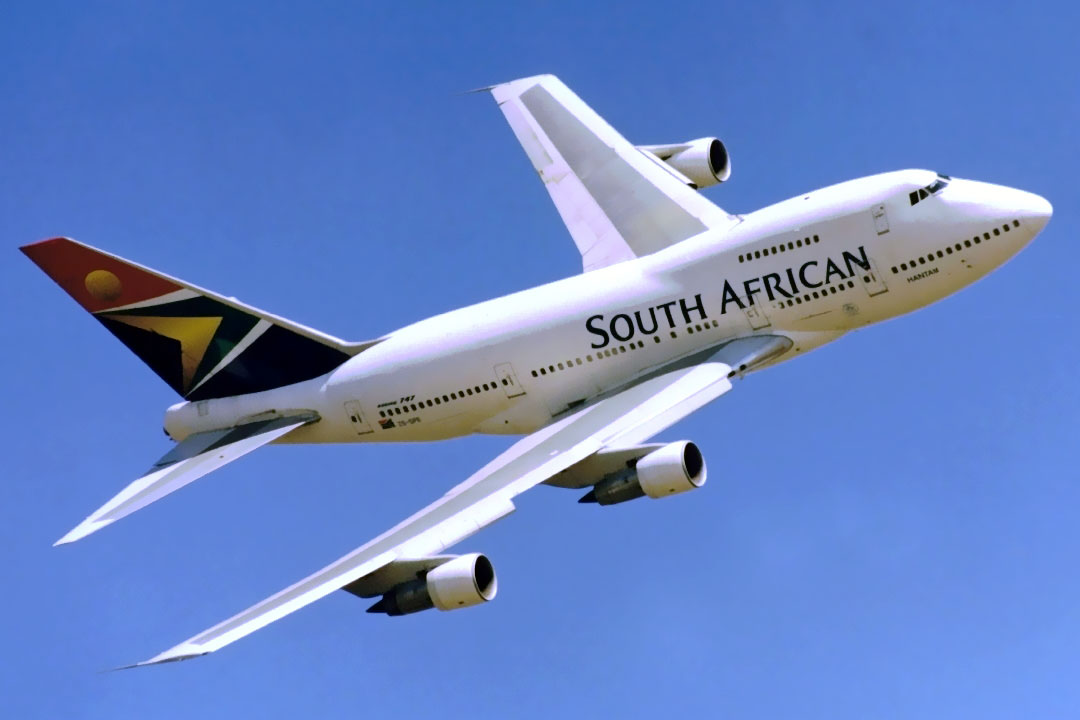
South African Airways (SAA) acquired the 747SP in 1976 to enable nonstop services on European routes while avoiding airspaces where South African aircraft were banned.

One isolated example of routes influenced by global politics was the network of South African Airways (SAA), which strained its 747s to their operational limits by flying them along the African coast rather than over the continent on flights to Europe during the 1970s and 1980s. This was due to other African nations banning South African aircraft from their airspace in protest over apartheid since 1963. When SAA introduced the first 747 service from an African carrier in December 1971, the range of early 747s in production at the time was insufficient for nonstop long-haul operations, hence the inclusion of stopovers in Luanda and Las Palmas on the European Springbok Service where SAA's 747-200Bs were first deployed. This led to SAA's decision to order the 747SP, of which SAA was the first non-U.S. carrier to receive, for nonstop flights. SAA's first 747SP set the record for the longest unrefuelled flight on its delivery from Seattle to Cape Town in 1976, and it held this record until the delivery flight of Qantas' first 747-400, named City of Canberra, from London to Sydney in 1989.

The 747 mainly appealed to operators with long-haul services outside the United States due to having more range than its contemporaries, the DC-10 and L-1011. Partly in response to accidents involving the DC-10 and the worldwide grounding of DC-10 fleets in 1979, some airlines, such as Air New Zealand, Alitalia, and Singapore Airlines, completely replaced their DC-10s with 747s for fleet standardisation and deployed the latter on routes previously assigned to the former; Pakistan International Airlines traded its remaining DC-10s with Canadian Pacific Air Lines (also known as CP Air) for the latter airline's 747-200s in 1986. Other airlines maintained fleets of smaller widebody types as complements to the 747 and assigned them to routes that either had airports too small to accommodate the 747 or did not have enough passenger traffic to fill a 747, as was the case for operators like JAL, KLM, Northwest Airlines, and Philippine Airlines that expanded their 747 fleets while simultaneously operating DC-10s during the 1980s. L-1011s were also operated alongside 747s in the fleets of airlines like Air Canada, ANA, British Airways, Cathay Pacific, and Saudia, while airlines such as Air France, Alitalia, Garuda Indonesia, Korean Air, Lufthansa, Malaysia Airlines, SAA, and Thai Airways operated A300s together with their 747s. In much rarer cases observed during the 1980s, there were airlines whose widebody fleets were purely composed of 747s until the introduction of newer types designed within the decade, examples including Aerolíneas Argentinas, Air India, Avianca, El Al, and Qantas.

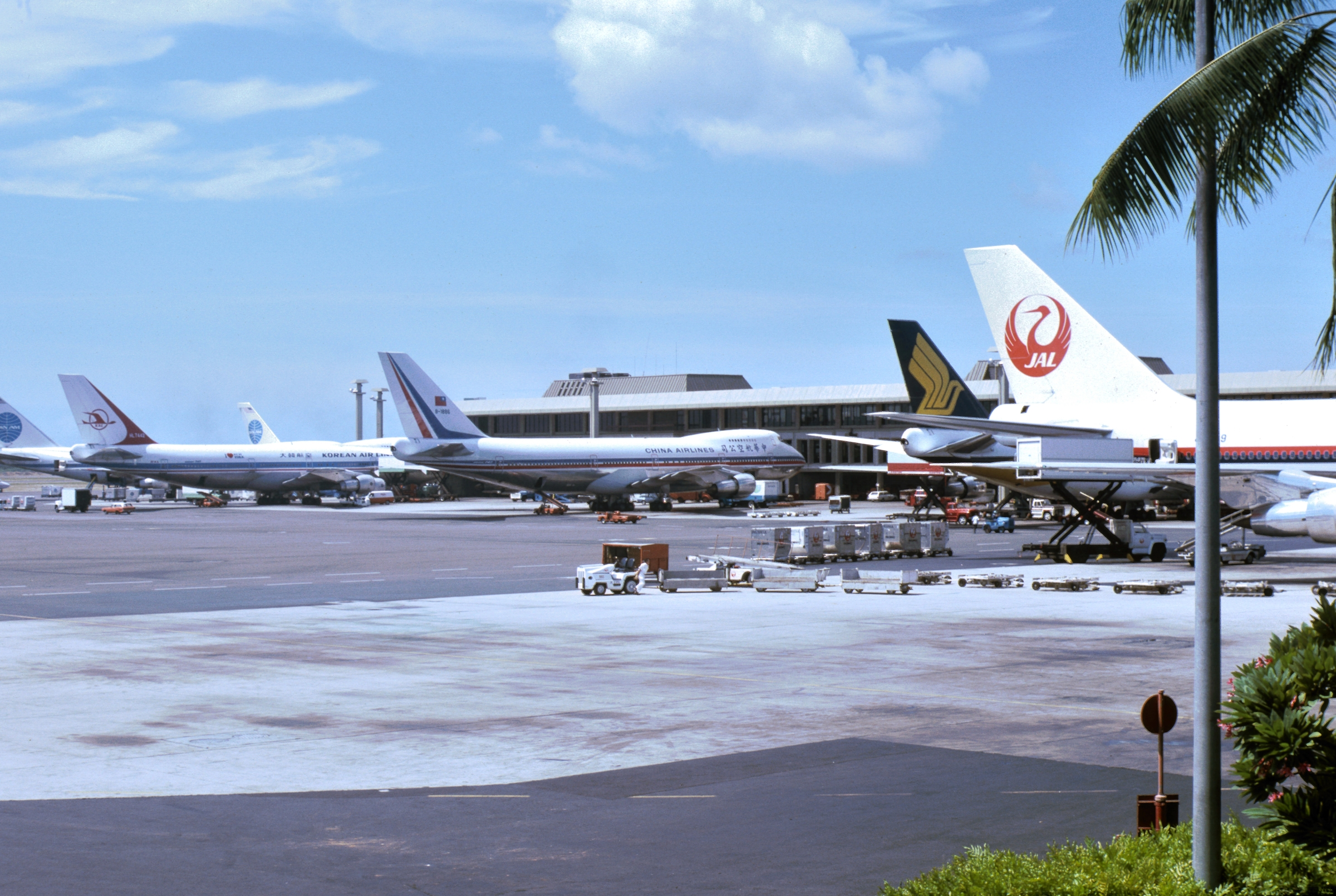
747s at Honolulu International Airport in 1981. The 747 was a common sight at airports along the Pacific Ocean.

By 1982, a total of 542 747s were in active service worldwide. Asia-Pacific operators accounted for 31% of the global 747 fleet, with a total of 169 examples across all airlines in the region. The 747's prominence at airports in the Asia-Pacific region was noticed by its chief designer, Joe Sutter, who frequently traveled to Asia on business trips during his lifetime and wrote about his habit of watching 747s at airports beginning in the mid-1980s. On one such trip to Japan, he recalled counting 55 747s at Narita International Airport in Tokyo while waiting for his flight home, remarking in his autobiography that the 747s "clustered as thickly as single-aisle 737s do at U.S. airports." Sutter estimated that, assuming each 747 was at most 75% occupied, they carried as many as 20,000 people within the two hours he spent watching 747s arrive at Narita Airport.

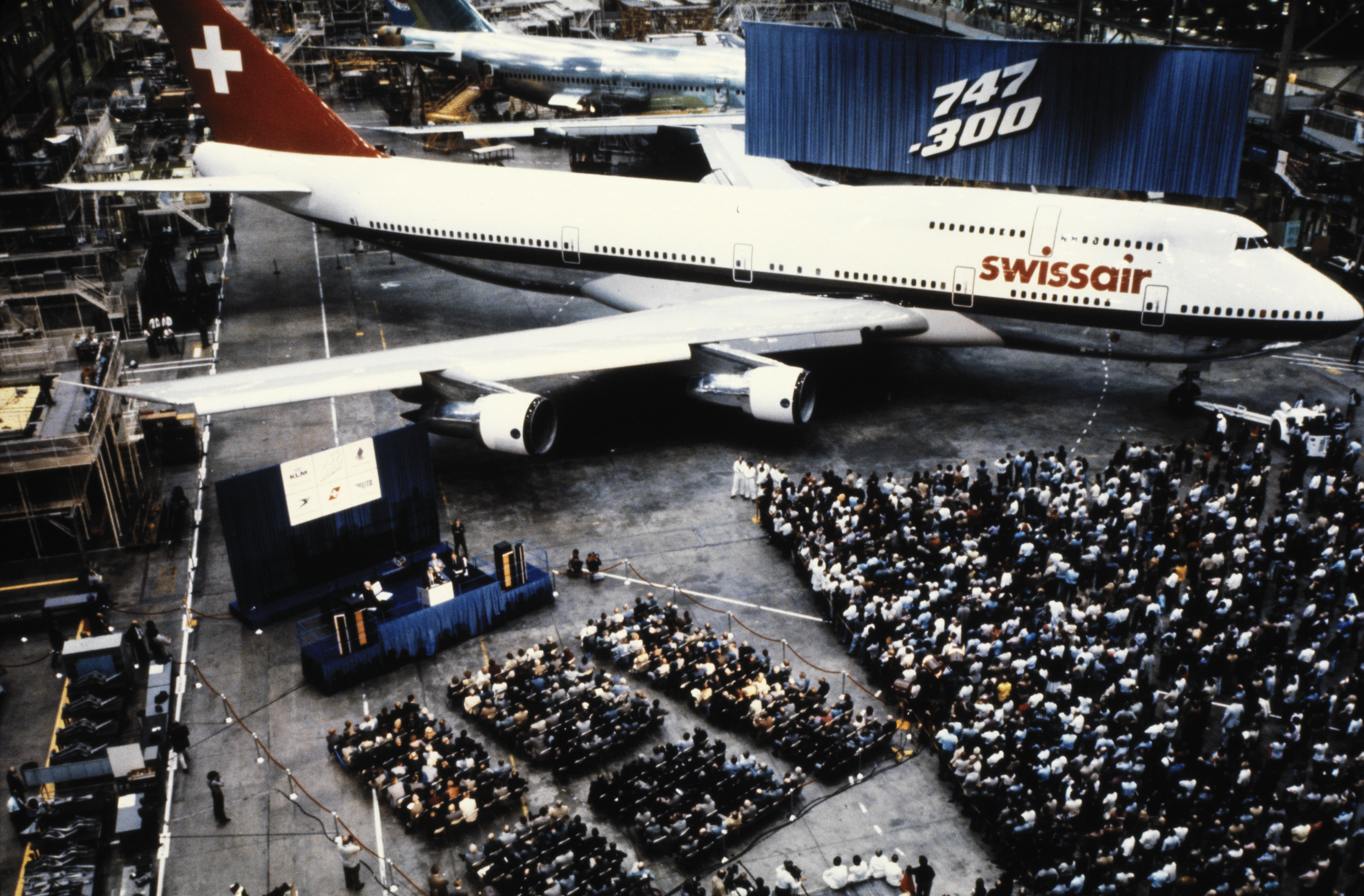
Presentation of Swissair's first 747-300M at the Boeing Everett Factory in January 1983.

On June 11, 1980, Boeing announced the development of the stretched upper deck (SUD) configuration that extended the upper deck of the basic design by 23.3 feet (7.1 m). The SUD configuration was utilized on the 747-300 variant, the first of which (line number 570) was rolled out of the Boeing Everett Factory on September 15, 1982, before its maiden flight on October 5. UTA received the first all-passenger version of the 747-300 on March 1, 1983, five days before fellow KSSU consortium member Swissair took delivery of the first 747-300M Combi. The SUD configuration was subsequently offered as a conversion for existing 747-100 and -200 airframes with the original shorter upper deck. Between 1984 and 1986, Boeing converted three 747-200Bs and seven 747-200Ms for KLM and two 747-200s for UTA to the SUD configuration.

Throughout the 1980s, international flights bypassing traditional hub airports and landing at smaller cities became more common, thus eroding the 747's original market. The 747 also began seeing use with low-cost carriers like PEOPLExpress and Virgin Atlantic, the latter of which flew its inaugural service between London's Gatwick Airport and Newark with an ex-Aerolíneas Argentinas 747-287B, on June 22, 1984. Soon, Virgin acquired more secondhand 747s and expanded its operations from its Gatwick hub to other U.S. cities like Boston, Miami, New York, Los Angeles, San Francisco, and Washington D.C., as well as to cities in other continents like Hong Kong, Johannesburg, and Tokyo. Virgin Atlantic primarily competed with other transatlantic 747 services, specifically those from British Airways, British Caledonian, Pan Am, and TWA, from the 1980s to the 1990s. Virgin's 747s notably carried custom registration serials referencing the company's name (e.g. G-VIRG, G-VGIN), as well as the names of the destinations they flew to (e.g. G-VJFK, G-VMIA, G-VLAX, G-TKYO).

Some airlines leased additional 747s to accommodate increased passenger flow to small destinations during special occasions, one example being the leasing of additional 747s by airlines in Muslim-majority countries like Garuda Indonesia for flights to Saudi Arabia during the annual Hajj pilgrimage.

With the introduction of the 747-400, production of the Classic generation variants ceased. Boeing delivered the last -300 to Sabena in 1990, while Nippon Cargo Airlines received the last -200, a -200F, in 1991.

==== 747-400 ====
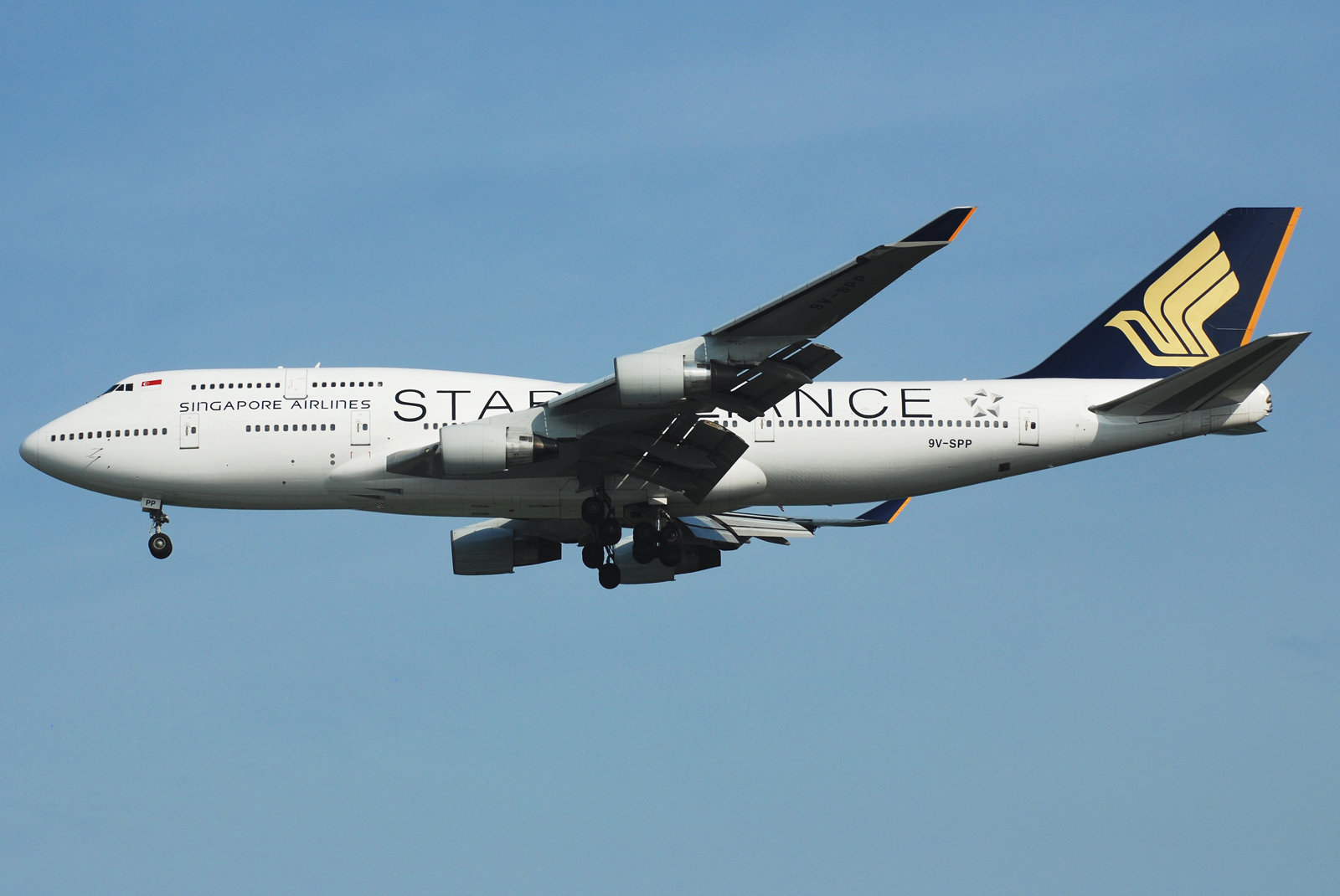
747-400 of Singapore Airlines, the variant's first non-U.S. customer, wearing a special Star Alliance livery.

In the early 1980s, customers began voicing complaints about the incremental approach Boeing took to developing the 747s, as previous 747 variants up to the -300 shared the same systems of the original 747-100 of 1968 and were not updated with newer technologies that were incorporated into the Boeing 757 and 767 twinjets. To meet the demands of airlines, Boeing formed a consultative group with British Airways, Cathay Pacific, KLM, Lufthansa, Northwest Airlines, Qantas, and Singapore Airlines. Consultation with these airlines led to the launch of the 747-400, a major redesign based on the 747-300, in 1985. As recommended by the consultative group, the -400 incorporated the technology already used by the 757 and 767, specifically a glass cockpit, which featured electronic flight instruments instead of the electro-mechanical analog systems of the older 747 Classic generation (i.e. 747-100/200/300/SP), as well as a two-man crew setup that eliminated the need for a flight engineer. Performance and range were also enhanced with increased fuel capacity, aerodynamic improvements (i.e. longer wingspan and added winglets), and more powerful engines.

Singapore Airlines was the first non-U.S. carrier to receive 747-400s, the first of which was delivered to the airline on March 18, 1989. It also inaugurated the first international service of the -400 with a nonstop Singapore–London route on May 30. Not long after the inauguration of Singapore Airlines' first -400 service, many more carriers in the Asia-Pacific region began ordering the -400, as its range was sufficient to start nonstop transpacific routes to the American continent, particularly the West Coast of the United States, eliminating the need for refueling stopovers in cities like Honolulu.

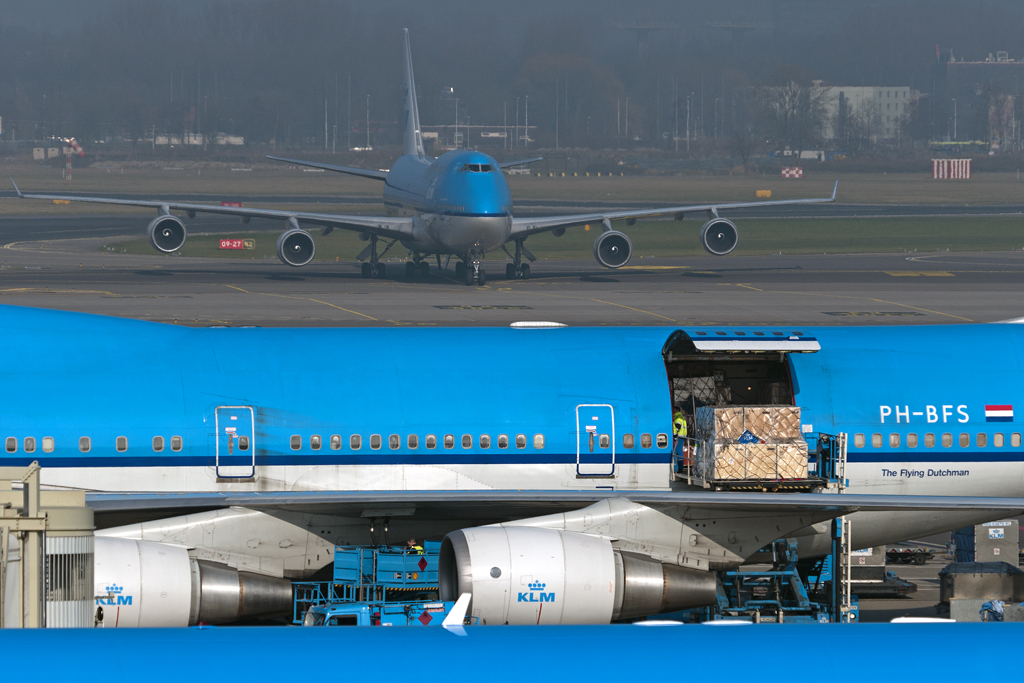
Closeup of an open side cargo door on a KLM 747-400M.

The first 747-400s of the variant's first European customers, KLM and Lufthansa, were delivered on May 18 and May 23, 1989, respectively, with a temporary 90-day type certificate issued by the European Joint Aviation Authorities, then known as the Joint Airworthiness Requirements (JAR) committee. This was due to the JAR declaring the 747-400 noncompliant with structural damage resistance standards, arguing that it was expected to remain in service for the next 30 years and was therefore subject to stricter regulations first imposed in a 1980 JAR resolution despite its compliance with FAA regulations and structural similarity to its already certificated predecessor, the 747-300. In exchange for the temporary type certification, Boeing agreed to develop strengthened floor beams as a standard on succeeding -400 airframes and as a conversion for airframes already in service.

Months after receiving its first -400, KLM introduced the -400M Combi, the first of which was flown at the end of June 1989 and delivered to the airline on September 1.

In November 2000, Boeing announced an order from Qantas for six 747-400ERs, an improved variant of the 747-400 with increased range and payload capabilities. Qantas received its first 747-400ER on October 31, 2002, and would ultimately be the only customer of the variant.

== Cargo airlines ==
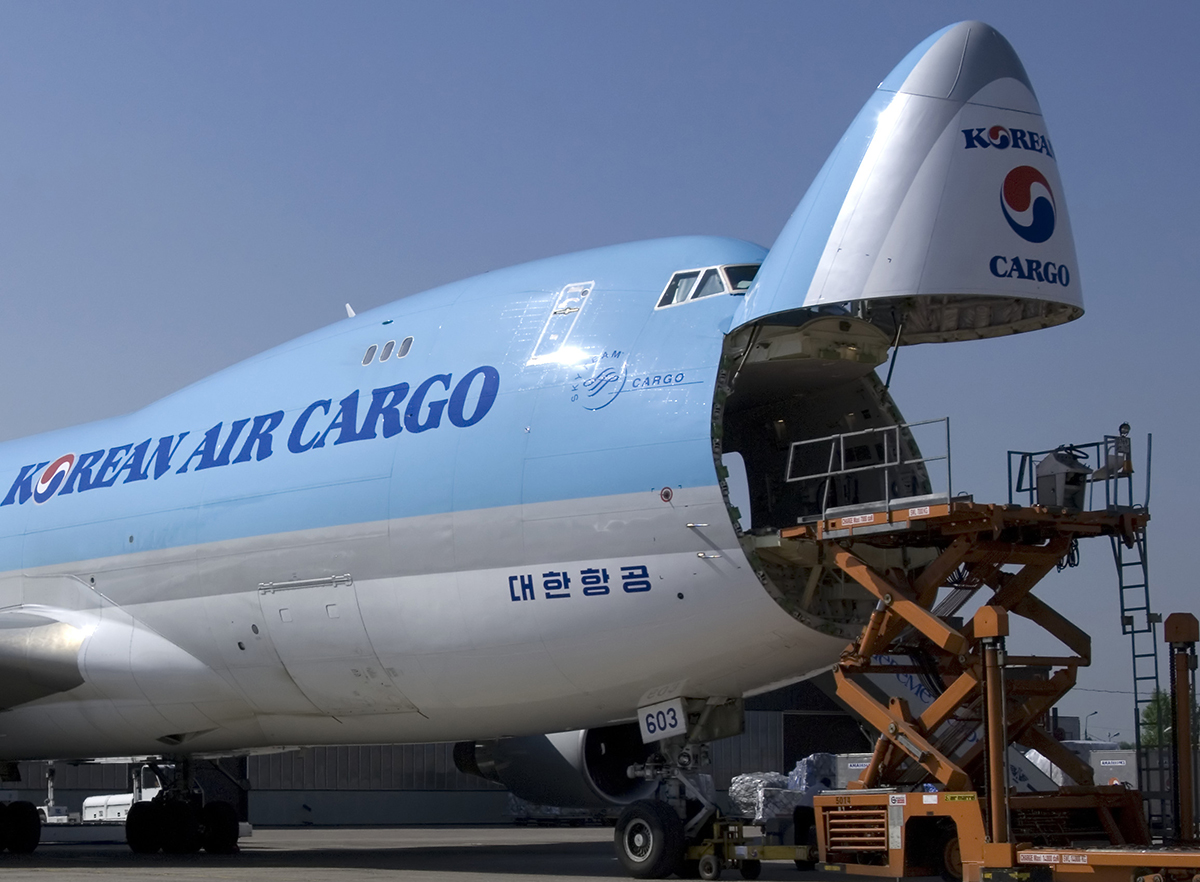
Korean Air Cargo 747-400F with its nose door open.

Just as the design team had envisioned, the 747 also saw use as a freighter. Its design enabled not only the assembly of dedicated freighter aircraft but also the conversion of surplus airframes that were no longer wanted by passenger airlines, as the design team expected during its development that 747s would see more frequent usage as freighters as demand for passenger-carrying 747s would wane.

However, while the design team assumed that this decrease in demand for passenger 747s would come as a result of increased interest in the supersonic airliners in development at the time, such as Concorde and the cancelled Boeing 2707, this ultimately did not happen; instead, this decrease was caused by the introduction of ETOPS-capable widebody twinjets from the 1980s to the 2000s, such as the Airbus A310 and A330 and Boeing's own 767, 777, and 787, which were more efficient to operate than the trijets and quadjets which preceded them. Indeed, tri- and quadjet designs from the same era - including the Airbus A380, which was designed to compete directly with the 747 - struggled to reach commercial success.

Dedicated freighter variants were typically assembled with an upward-opening hinged nose and a side cargo door for freight loading, while conversions on former passenger airframes only added the side cargo door and reinforced the main deck floor while removing seats, galleys, toilets, overhead baggage stowage, and other passenger accommodations.

=== 747-200F ===
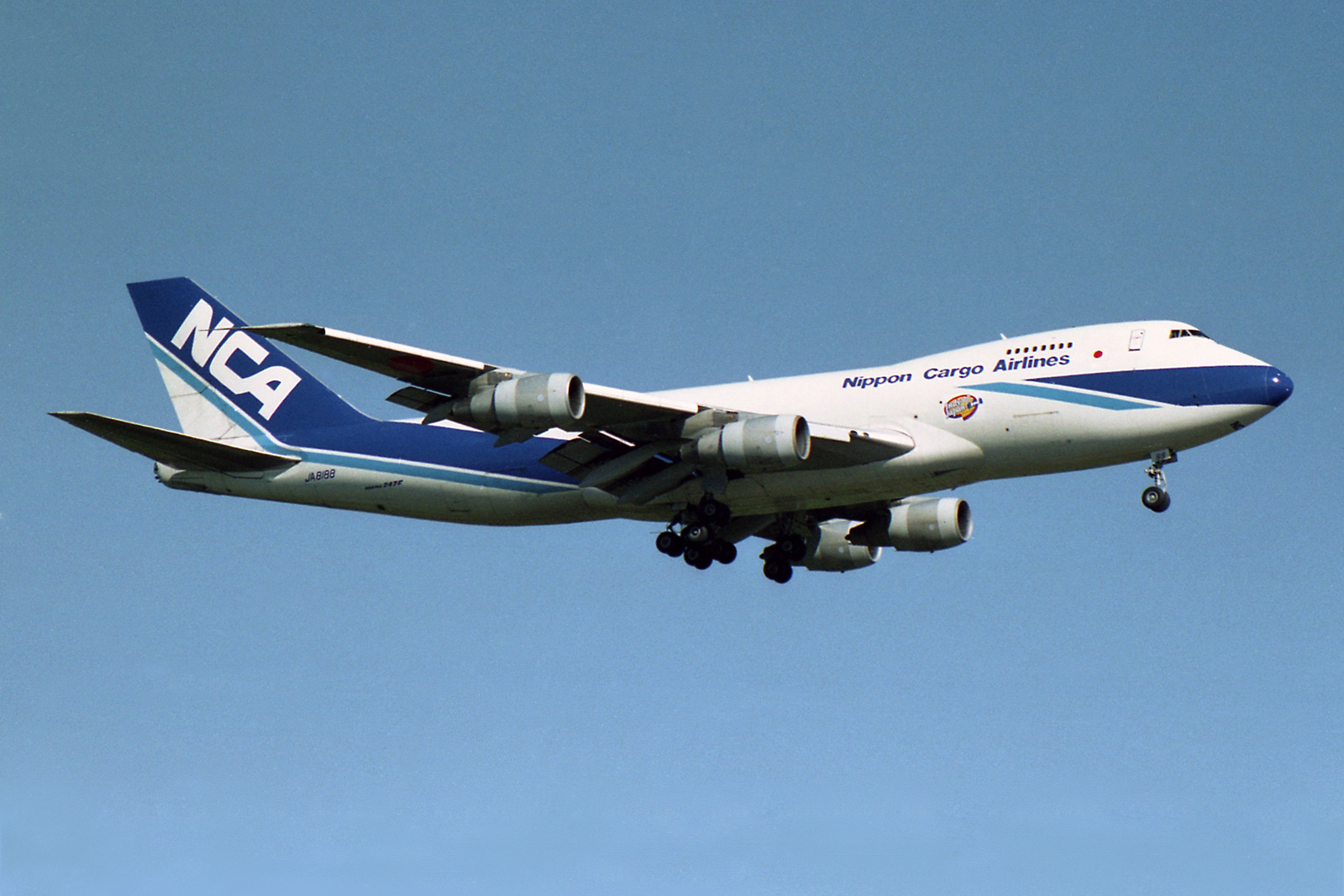
747-200F of Nippon Cargo Airlines (NCA), the last customer of the 747-200.

The first dedicated freighter variant was the 747-200F introduced by Lufthansa under the Lufthansa Cargo brand, which took delivery of the first -200F on March 9, 1972. Lufthansa Cargo was the sole operator of the type until Air France, Japan Airlines, and Seaboard World Airlines followed with their own orders for 747-200Fs in 1974.

Until the launch of the 747-400F on September 13, 1989, the 747-200 was the only variant offered with dedicated freighter subvariants that could be ordered directly from Boeing. Airlines could order either the pure freighter -200F, the convertible -200C that could be switched between pure passenger or freight configurations, or the -200M Combi designed to carry mixed passenger and freight loads on the main deck simultaneously. Boeing delivered the last 747-200F to Nippon Cargo Airlines (NCA) in 1991, and production of all -200 models immediately ceased.

=== 747-400F/400ERF ===
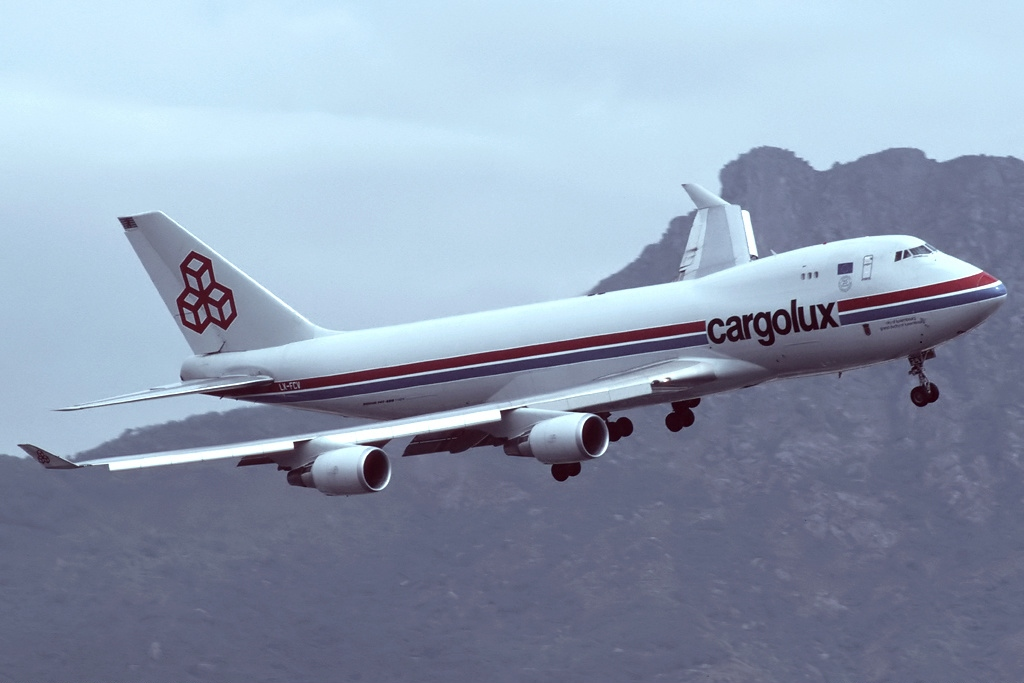
747-400F of the variant's first customer, Cargolux, landing at Hong Kong's Kai Tak Airport in 1996.

Assembly of the first 747-400F, the improved freighter variant with the newer flight systems of the 747-400 series, began in October 1992. The aircraft retained the basic fuselage outline of the -200F, albeit with the longer wings and two-man cockpit of the -400. Although Air France was slated to be the launch customer of the type, it cancelled its initial order due to the length of time that passed between the launch and rollout of the type. Nonetheless, the maiden flight of the prototype -400F went ahead on May 4, 1993, and the first delivery of a -400F was made to Cargolux in November.

=== Freighter Conversions ===
In 1974, Boeing initiated a program offering freighter conversions for passenger-carrying 747-100s. The first conversion from a passenger airframe was conducted at Boeing's Wichita plant on an ex-American Airlines 747-100 acquired by Flying Tiger Line. Within the decade, Boeing Wichita performed freighter conversions on ex-passenger 747-100s operated by American Airlines, Pan Am, and the Imperial Iranian Air Force.

By the late 1980s, demand for freighter conversions increased as cargo operators got their hands on older 747s, many of which had been phased out from the fleets of passenger airlines, to transport heavy freight loads across long distances. In response to increased demand for freighter conversions, Boeing Wichita launched a new conversion program in August 1989. The new program extended from the previous one by covering passenger-carrying subvariants of the 747-200 and, later in 1995, the 747-300, the latter of which had never been sold as a pure freighter directly from Boeing's assembly line during its production run. By 1997, Boeing Wichita had modified an estimated 70 747s from passenger to freighter configuration. During the 1990s, the 747 became a favored choice of aircraft for small cargo carriers, particularly those in the United States, such as Atlas Air, Kalitta Air, and Southern Air Transport.

Not long after the introduction of the 747-400F, Boeing offered freighter conversions for passenger variants of the 747-400, with the first conversion being conducted in 1994 at Boeing Wichita to convert two 747-400s of EVA Air from passenger to Combi configuration.

== Government and military operators ==
=== United States ===
==== United States Air Force ====
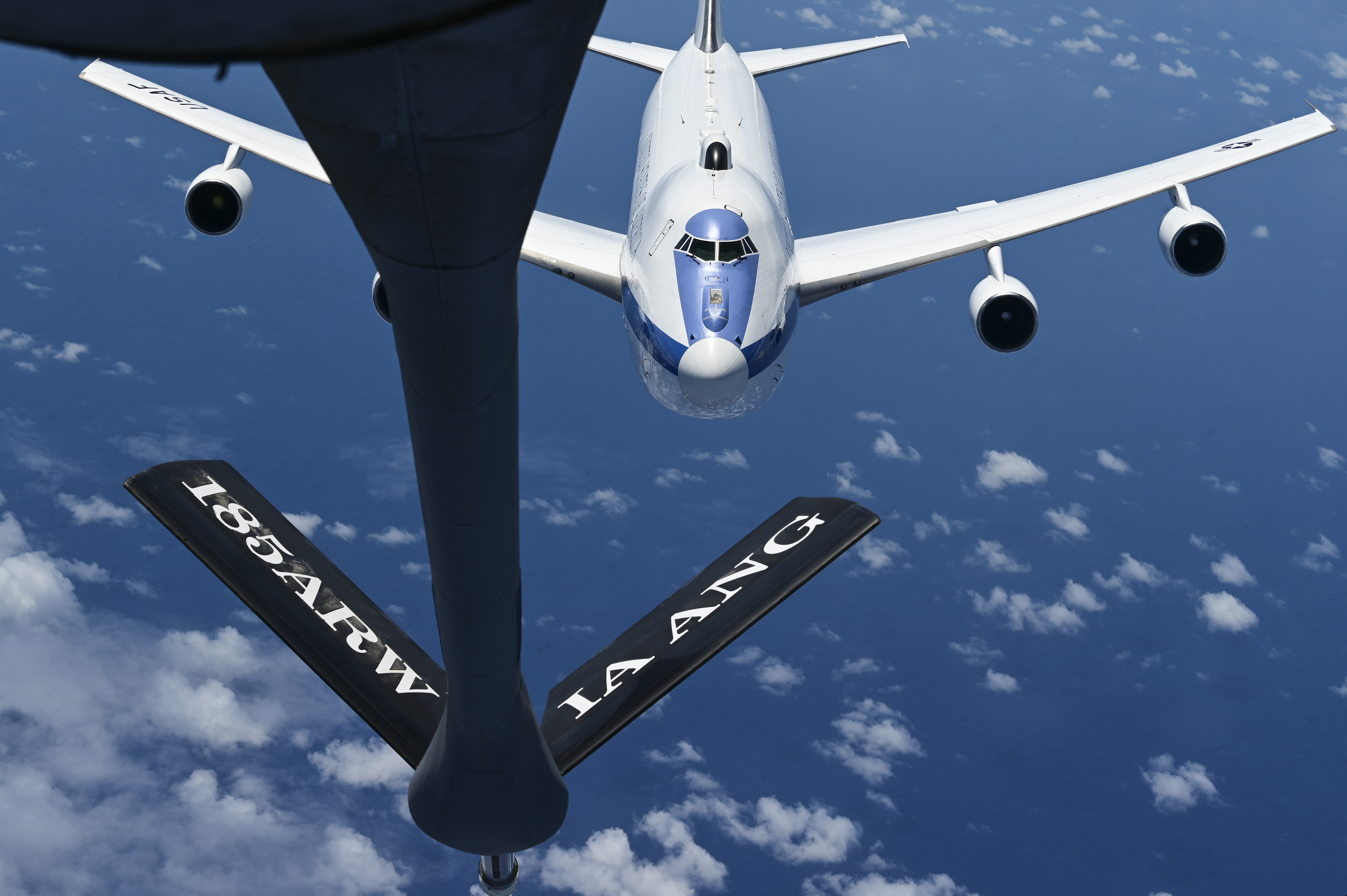
E-4B airborne command post as seen from a KC-135 tanker

The United States Air Force (USAF) operates specially designed variants of the Boeing 747 for its purposes, namely the E-4B airborne command posts of the National Emergency Airborne Command Post (NEACP) program and the VC-25 presidential transports. Both aircraft were developed as replacements for KC-135/707 derivatives that previously performed their respective roles, with the E-4 replacing the EC-135 in 1973 and the VC-25 replacing the VC-137C in 1990.

The first three E-4 airframes were initially designated E-4A and delivered between June 1973 and October 1974 with almost the same equipment as the EC-135, albeit with minor updates. In May 1975, the fourth aircraft was delivered as the updated E-4B, which introduced a super-high-frequency (SHF) satellite antenna mounted on the upper deck roof among other upgrades. Its design, however, was not finalized until January 1980. The first three aircraft were subsequently updated to E-4B specifications between 1983 and 1985.

The VC-25 was developed in the 1980s when the administration of Ronald Reagan chose the 747 as the replacement for the aging pair of VC-137Cs that had been in service since 1962. Like the E-4, the initial VC-25A variant was based on the 747-200B, albeit with newer General Electric CF6-80C2B1 engines similar to those installed on the 747-400 instead of the older CF6-50E2s installed on the E-4Bs and other CF6-powered 747-200s. The VC-25As are distinguished from civilian 747s by extensive modifications for presidential airlift missions, most notably executive rooms, aerial refueling equipment, and electronic countermeasures against attacks. The first VC-25A, designated SAM 28000 (serial no. 82-8000), rolled out in September 1989 and flew for the first time on January 26, 1990. Both SAM 28000 and its sister ship, SAM 29000 (serial no. 92-9000), were in USAF service by late 1990.

On June 20, 2026, SAM 29000 flew its last presidential mission carrying Donald Trump on his return trip from the 52nd G7 summit in France to Joint Base Andrews. The aircraft's retirement from presidential service came shortly before the unveiling of the VC-25B Bridge, a modified 747-8 that was acquired from the Qatari government to serve as an interim replacement for the VC-25As during the ongoing modification of the 747-8s originally intended to serve as VC-25Bs.

===== Government contract flights =====
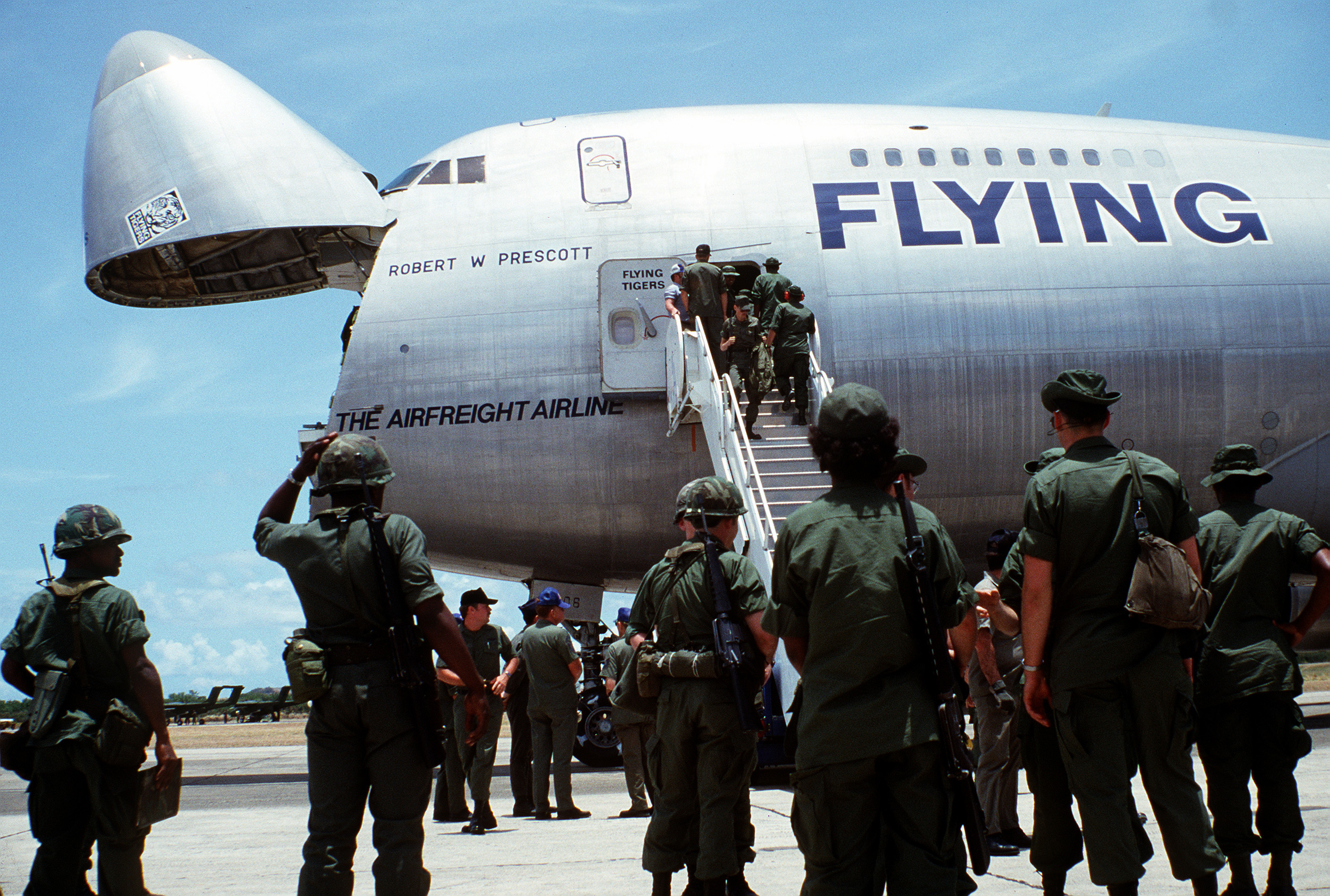
U.S. Army infantrymen of the 101st Airborne Division disembarking from a Flying Tiger Line 747-200F deployed at Roosevelt Roads Naval Station for Exercise Ocean Venture, 1982.

Since the 1970s, civilian 747s have been chartered for government contract flights, most of which are handled under the Civil Reserve Air Fleet (CRAF).

One of the earliest deployments of civilian 747s into military service was Operation Babylift, the mass evacuation of South Vietnamese children to the United States during the closing stages of the Vietnam War. On April 5, 1975, two 747s of Pan Am were privately chartered to assist Military Airlift Command (MAC) transport aircraft in carrying 728 children from Tan Son Nhat International Airport in Saigon to the US West Coast, with one aircraft going to San Francisco and the other to Seattle. Seven days later on April 12, a World Airways 747-200C (Note: All of World Airways' 747s at that time were 747-200C models) was chartered to transport 329 children who had been left behind in Clark Air Base in Angeles City, Philippines, to Los Angeles.

Between 1985 and 1990, 19 of Pan Am's 747s, comprising 15 747-100s and 4 747-200Bs, were converted at Boeing Wichita for use by the CRAF as either troop transports or freighters in the event of a national emergency. Much like the 747-200C variant, the modified 747s, which were given the USAF designation C-19A, could be converted between passenger and freighter configurations, which was made possible by the installation of strengthened floor beams and a side cargo door aft of the left wing. The fuselage reinforcements and additional cargo door on the main deck added 13,000 pounds (5.9 t) to the empty weight of each aircraft, prompting the USAF to pay compensation for the increased weight whenever these aircraft were used on Pan Am's commercial flights. Three Pan Am aircraft were notably deployed along with 747s of Northwest Airlines as troop transports for Operation Desert Storm in 1990. Although none of the Pan Am 747s were destroyed during combat missions, one of the converted aircraft, a 747-121 named Clipper Maid of the Seas, was lost to a terrorist bomb attack while flying over Lockerbie, Scotland, as Pan Am Flight 103, a scheduled commercial flight, on December 21, 1988.

Despite rejecting Boeing's proposals for it to buy its own dedicated fleet of 747 freighters in favor of additional Lockheed C-5s and, later, Boeing C-17s, the USAF chartered 747s from airlines like Evergreen International Airlines, Flying Tiger Line, and Tower Air to conduct transport missions to overseas bases outside the United States throughout the 1980s and 1990s.

==== NASA ====
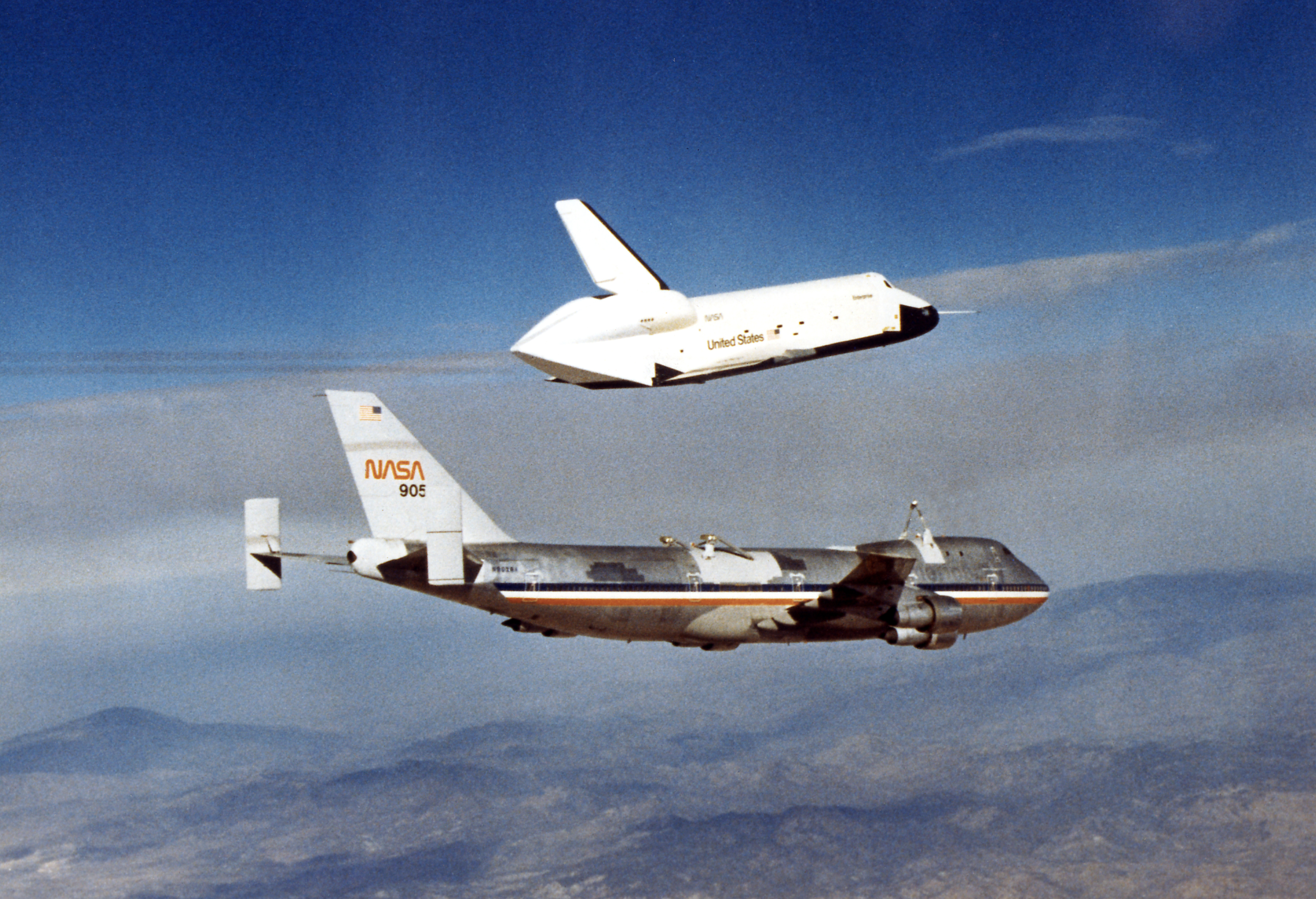
Shuttle Carrier Aircraft N905NA releasing the Space Shuttle Enterprise for a free flight test in 1977. N905NA is seen here partially painted in its former American Airlines livery with NASA titles.

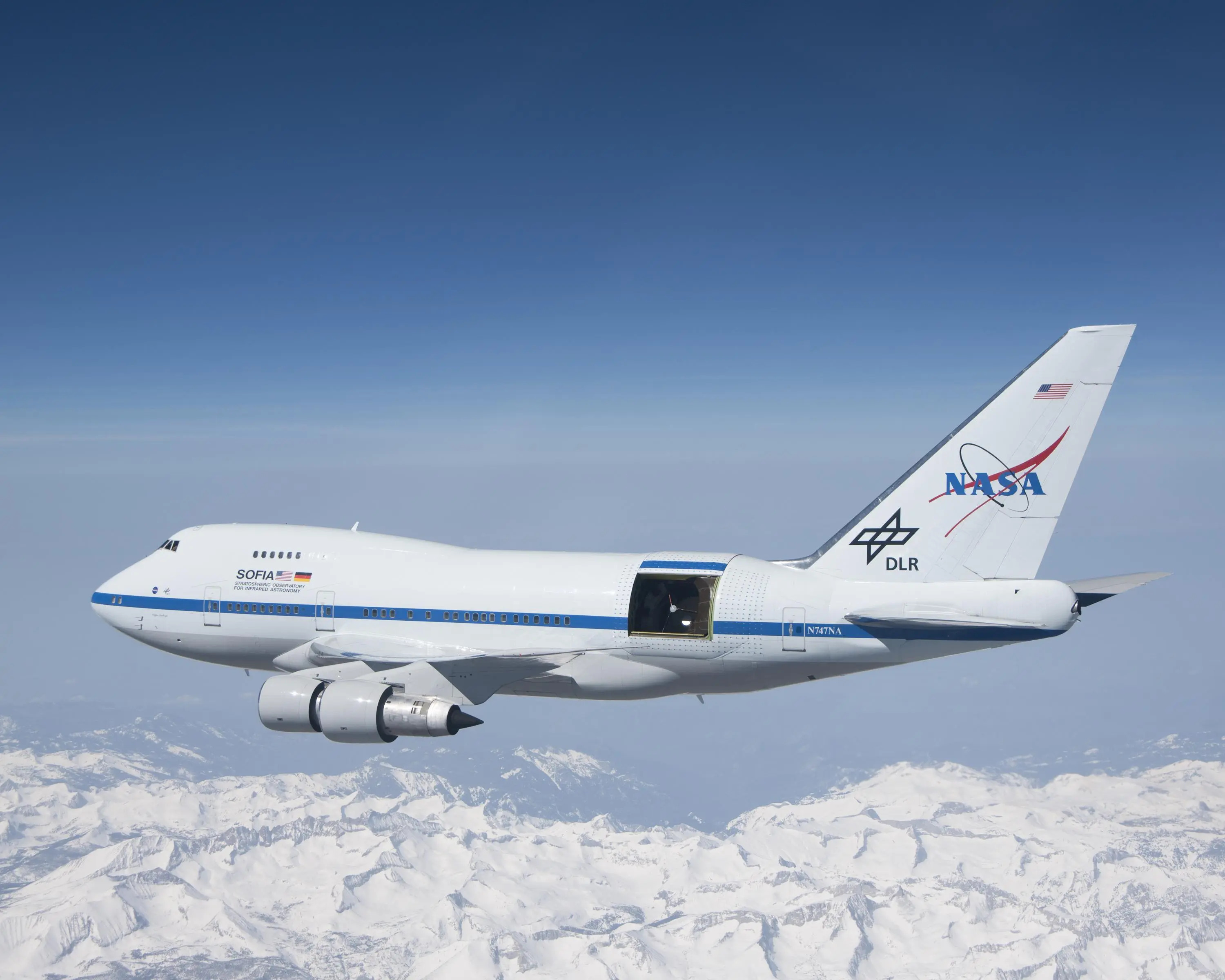
The Stratospheric Observatory for Infrared Astronomy (SOFIA)

The 747 participated in the American space program through NASA's usage of two secondhand 747s, comprising one 747-100 from American Airlines and one 747SR from Japan Airlines, as the Shuttle Carrier Aircraft (SCA) and one ex-Pan Am 747SP as the Stratospheric Observatory For Infrared Astronomy (SOFIA).

The SCA was proposed as a solution to the logistical challenges of transporting Space Shuttle orbiters after each mission across the continental United States from their landing site in Edwards Air Force Base in California to the launch site in Kennedy Space Center in Florida. The proposal materialized when the first airframe, an ex-American Airlines 747-123 registered as N905NA and previously used for vortex flow research, was converted by Boeing with components developed at NASA's Dryden Flight Research Center to enable the mounting and dismounting of the shuttle orbiters from the top of the aircraft's fuselage. From February 18 to August 13, 1977, the aircraft was deployed on a three-phase series of flights to test its handling with the Space Shuttle Enterprise mounted on top, with the third flight being the first of five involving the release of a crewed shuttle from the 747 in mid-air to enable the former to enter free flight and have its flight characteristics evaluated while the Shuttle crew glided back to Edwards Air Force Base.

Once the test flights concluded, N905NA was used to perform its originally proposed purpose of ferrying Space Shuttles between their landing and launch sites. In 1988, it was accompanied in the role by a 747SR-46 acquired from Japan Airlines and re-registered as N911NA in NASA service; N911NA was also the first production 747SR and had been delivered to Japan Airlines in 1973 to operate on domestic routes. SCA ferry flights lasted until the termination of the Space Shuttle program, at which point the SCAs were used to ferry retired orbiters to museums before they too were retired in 2012. N911NA is currently loaned by NASA to the city of Palmdale, California, for display at the Joe Davies Heritage Airpark, while N905NA is preserved at Space Center Houston with the mockup orbiter Independence mounted on its back.

In 1997, NASA acquired an ex-Pan Am 747SP-21 named Clipper Lindbergh for use as the platform for SOFIA, an airborne observatory operated as a joint project with the German Aerospace Center. The aircraft was modified by Raytheon with an 18 ft × 13.5 ft (5.5 m × 4.1 m) door on the left side of the fuselage to accommodate a large reflector telescope, which was assembled in Germany and shipped to the United States for mounting on the airframe in 2004. The aircraft was operational with the telescope by 2010 and conducted a series of observatory flights until its retirement in 2022 due to rising operational costs. As of 2022, the aircraft is preserved at the Pima Air & Space Museum in Tucson, Arizona.

=== Iran ===
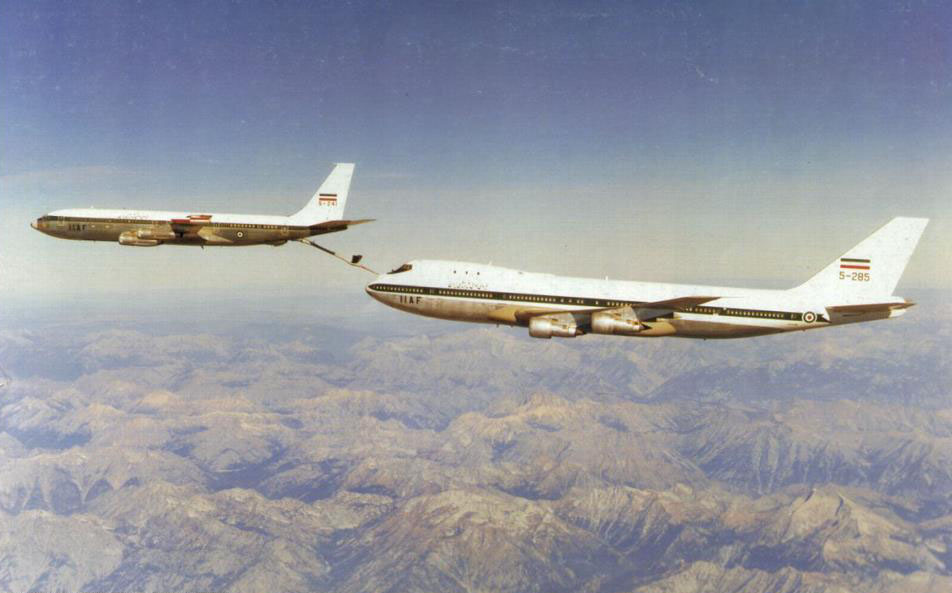
Imperial Iranian Air Force (IIAF) Boeing 747-100F refueling from a KC-707 tanker.

The only air force with its own dedicated fleet of 747 freighters was the Islamic Republic of Iran Air Force (IRIAF), formerly known as the Imperial Iranian Air Force (IIAF). In 1975, the IIAF acquired twelve passenger 747s, comprising nine ex-TWA 747-131s and three ex-Continental Airlines 747-124s, for conversion into freighters. All but one of the ex-TWA aircraft were converted, with three of them undergoing additional conversions into aerial refueling tankers, which were designated KC-747 and based on specifications for Boeing's entry into the USAF's Advanced Cargo Transport Aircraft (ACTA) program for a new tanker aircraft that ultimately chose the McDonnell Douglas DC-10 as the basis for the proposed tanker, later designated KC-10. The only ex-TWA airframe not converted, registration serial N93119, was instead returned to TWA in 1976 and continued its service as a passenger airliner for another 20 years until it crashed as TWA Flight 800. The ex-Continental Airlines aircraft, of which only one was converted into a freighter, also did not last long in the IIAF inventory and were all back in service with civilian operators by 1978.

The IIAF later ordered five brand new 747-2J9Fs, of which only four were delivered between December 1977 and October 1978. The fifth -200F, which was first flown on September 17, 1979, was not delivered to the IIAF due to political tensions between the US and Iran after the Islamic Revolution of 1979. It was instead kept by Boeing until its delivery as a civilian freighter for Northwest Airlines on September 15, 1983. The rest of the 747s remained in the inventory of Iran's air force, by then renamed the Islamic Republic of Iran Air Force (IRIAF), although some aircraft were transferred to Iran Air.

During Operation Desert Storm, the Iranian government confiscated two Iraqi Airways 747-270Cs that had been evacuated to Iran and transferred one of the aircraft, registration serial YI-AGN, to the IRIAF inventory as a replacement for one of the IRIAF's 747-131Fs that reportedly had been destroyed during an Iraqi Air Force bombing raid over Urmia in 1985. The ex-Iraqi Airways 747 was jointly operated with Saha Airlines until the Iranian Civil Aviation Organization revoked Saha Airlines' operating certificate in 2013.

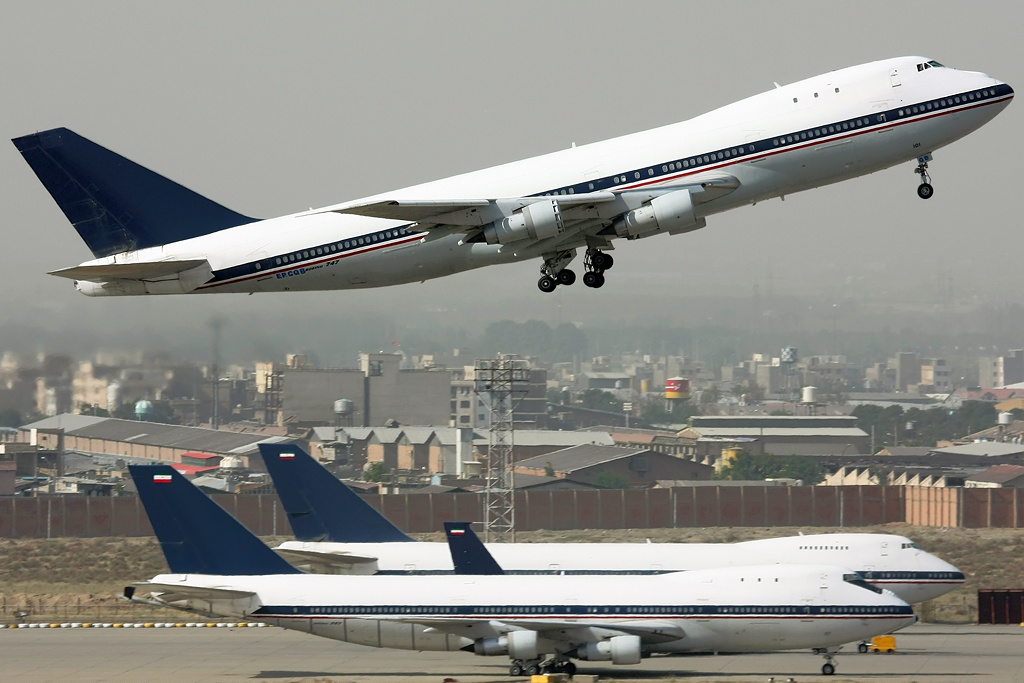
A Boeing 747-100 of the Islamic Republic of Iran Air Force (IRIAF) taking off in front of two other IRIAF 747s parked on the apron at Mehrabad International Airport.

During their service, the Iranian 747s were primarily used to carry troops and cargo, as well as the royal family prior to their overthrow. Their duties remained almost the same after Iran's change of administration. They were reported to have been deployed in conflicts such as the Iran–Iraq War, most notably in the H-3 airstrike of 1981 where a KC-747 provided aerial refueling for McDonnell Douglas F-4 Phantom II and Grumman F-14 Tomcat fighter aircraft while another 747 acted as an airborne command post.

Detailed information on the IRIAF 747s' operational history is not fully known to observers outside Iran. It is known, however, that during the IIAF era, at least one non-combat loss occurred when 5-283, formerly N53111 of TWA, was struck by lightning and crashed near Madrid. A 2018 Key Military article reported that 5-8106, formerly N93102 of TWA, was also destroyed when the Iraqi Air Force bombed the airport of Urmia in 1985. Its tail number was reassigned to the 747-270C confiscated from Iraqi Airways during Operation Desert Storm.

In 2018, aviation journalist Babak Taghvaee reported for Key Publishing under the Key Military publication that only three aircraft, comprising two freighters and one tanker, were still airworthy due to a lack of funds. Taghvaee followed up with another article for the same publisher, this time under the Key.Aero publication, that reported four aircraft were in service in 2026. These aircraft, which remained operational well into the 2020s, were eventually claimed to have been destroyed at Mehrabad International Airport by attacks from U.S. and Israeli forces. The Israeli Air Force (IAF) claimed the destruction of the last KC-747 tanker during Operation Rising Lion in June 2025, while Israeli and U.S. missile strikes in March 2026 subsequently destroyed the remaining operational aircraft, consisting of one 747-131SF, one 747-270C, and two 747-2J9Fs, as well as one ex-Air France 747-228B(SF) that had been kept in storage as a source of spare parts; the 747-131SF also happened to be the last operational 747-100 in the world at the time.

=== Other users ===
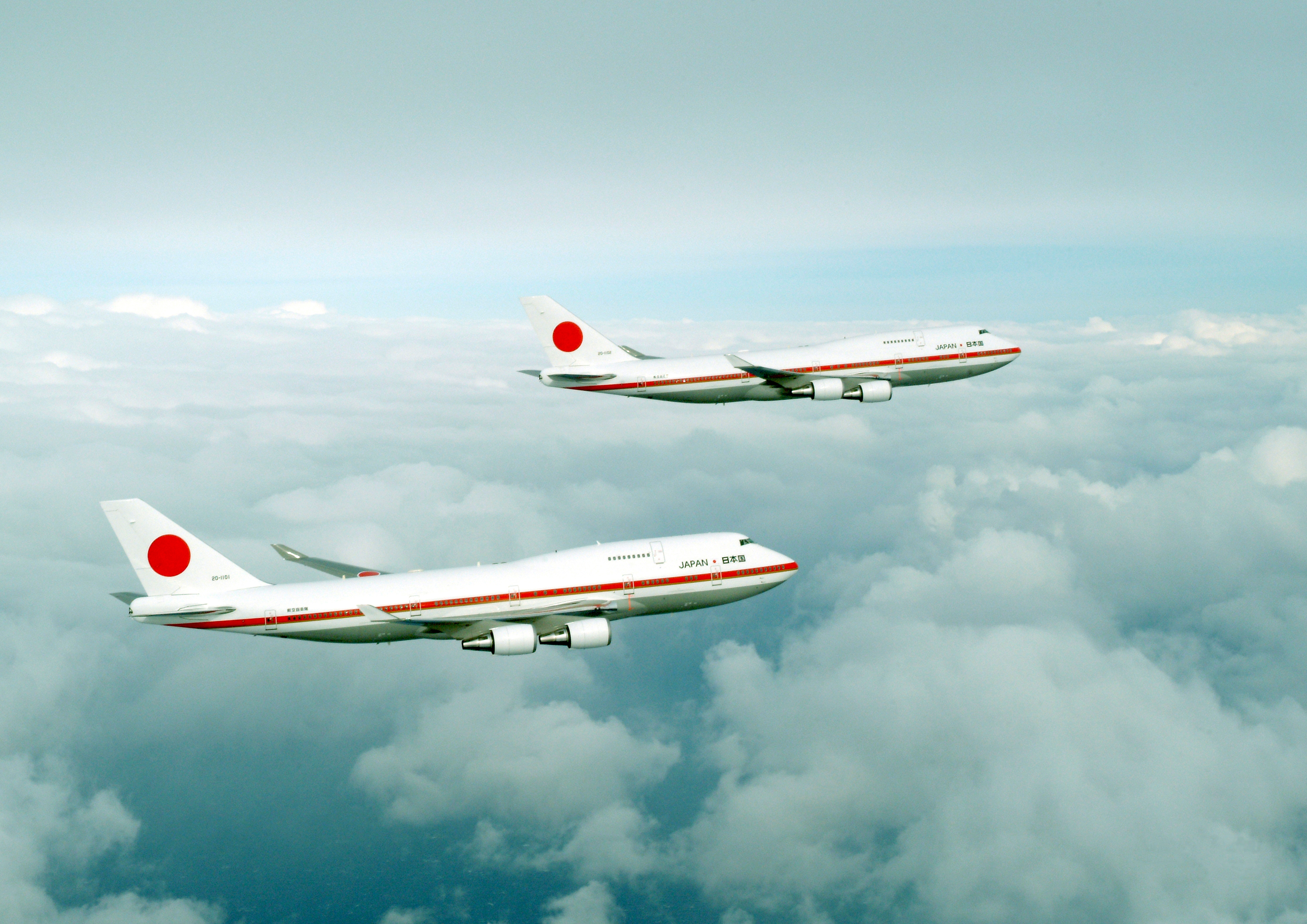
A pair of 747-400s that served as the first generation Japanese Air Force One fleet.

The Israeli Air Force (IAF) was also among the air forces that chartered 747s for transport and notably set a record in 1991, when 1,087 passengers were flown in an El Al 747-200C during Operation Solomon, a covert operation to airlift Ethiopian Jews from Addis Ababa to Tel Aviv; two other El Al 747s were also deployed in the operation, carrying 920 passengers each. The record set by the El Al 747-200C exceeded the maximum capacity of the 747-400, which typically carried between 416 and 524 passengers, and also broke a record previously held on December 29, 1974, by a Qantas 747-238B, named City of Melbourne, which carried 674 passengers, comprising 306 adults, 328 children, and 40 infants, from Darwin to Sydney following the devastation of Cyclone Tracy.

Other air forces have used 747s for the transport of government officials and other VIPs.

== See also ==
- List of Boeing 747 operators
- List of accidents and incidents involving the Boeing 747
