= Friends for All Children =

American adoption assistance agency

Friends For All Children was an adoption assistance agency that was located in Boulder, Colorado. It operated during the Vietnam War in Operation Babylift in 1975 to bring South Vietnamese children to the United States, during the Fall of Saigon, when the Communist North Vietnamese and their Viet Cong agents invaded South Vietnam. It disbanded in the United States, in 1977, after placement of the final child on their caseload.

It still operates in South East Asia.

== FFAC in Thailand ==
The Foundation “Friends For All Children”, otherwise known as FFAC, is a private, non-profit and non-sectarian organisation dedicated to the welfare of Thai children.

Established in 1977, FFAC was initially funded by Friends For All Children of Colorado, USA but now is independently managed by its Thai Executive Committee.
