= Operation Babylift =

Mass evacuation of children at the end of the Vietnam War

Coordinates: 10.8439°N 106.702°E

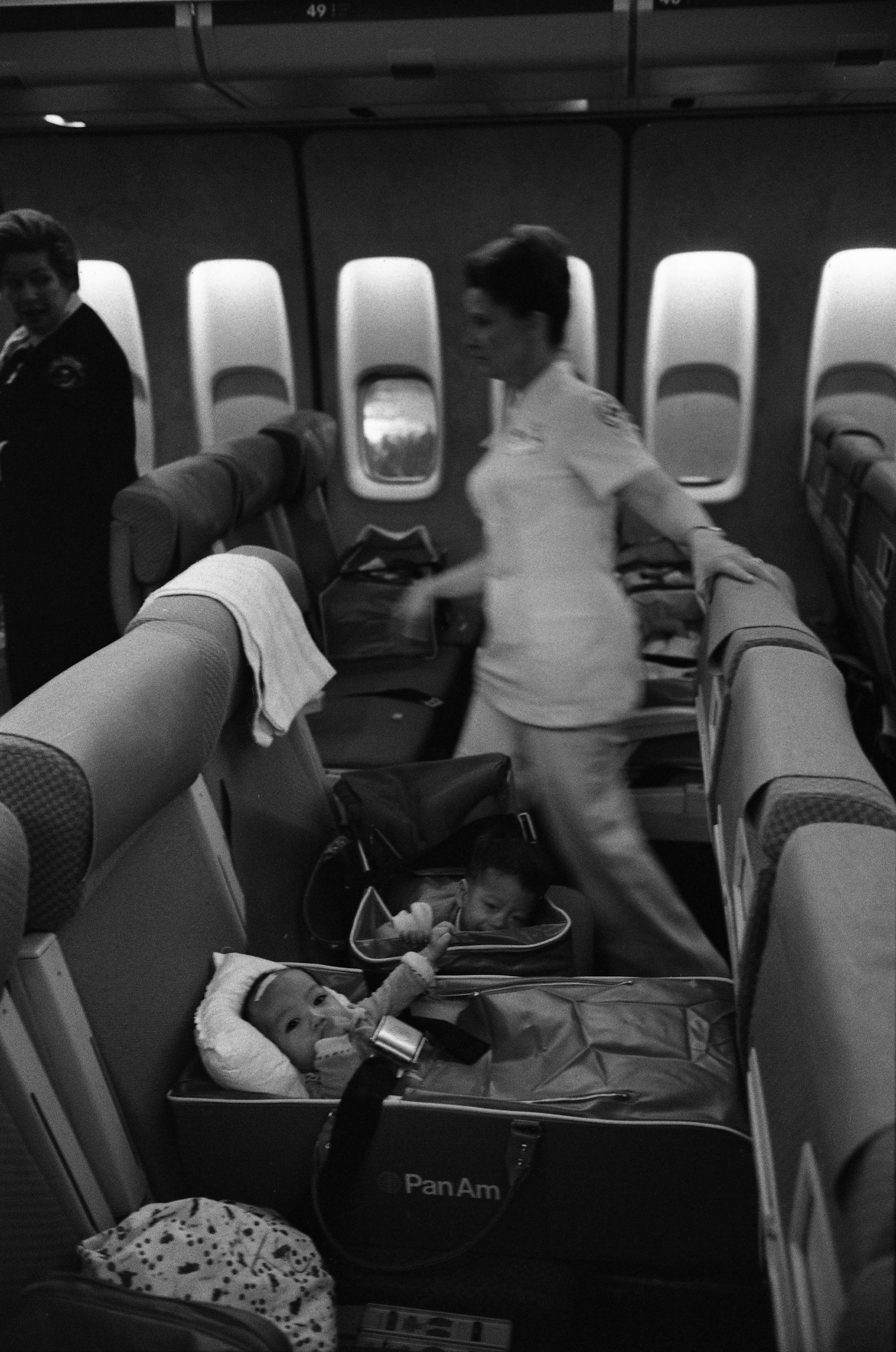
A Babylift flight arrives at San Francisco, 5 April 1975

Operation Babylift was a mass evacuation of children from South Vietnam to the United States and other Western countries at the end of the Vietnam War, in April 1975. Over 3,300 infants and children were airlifted, although the actual number has been variously reported.

== Overview ==
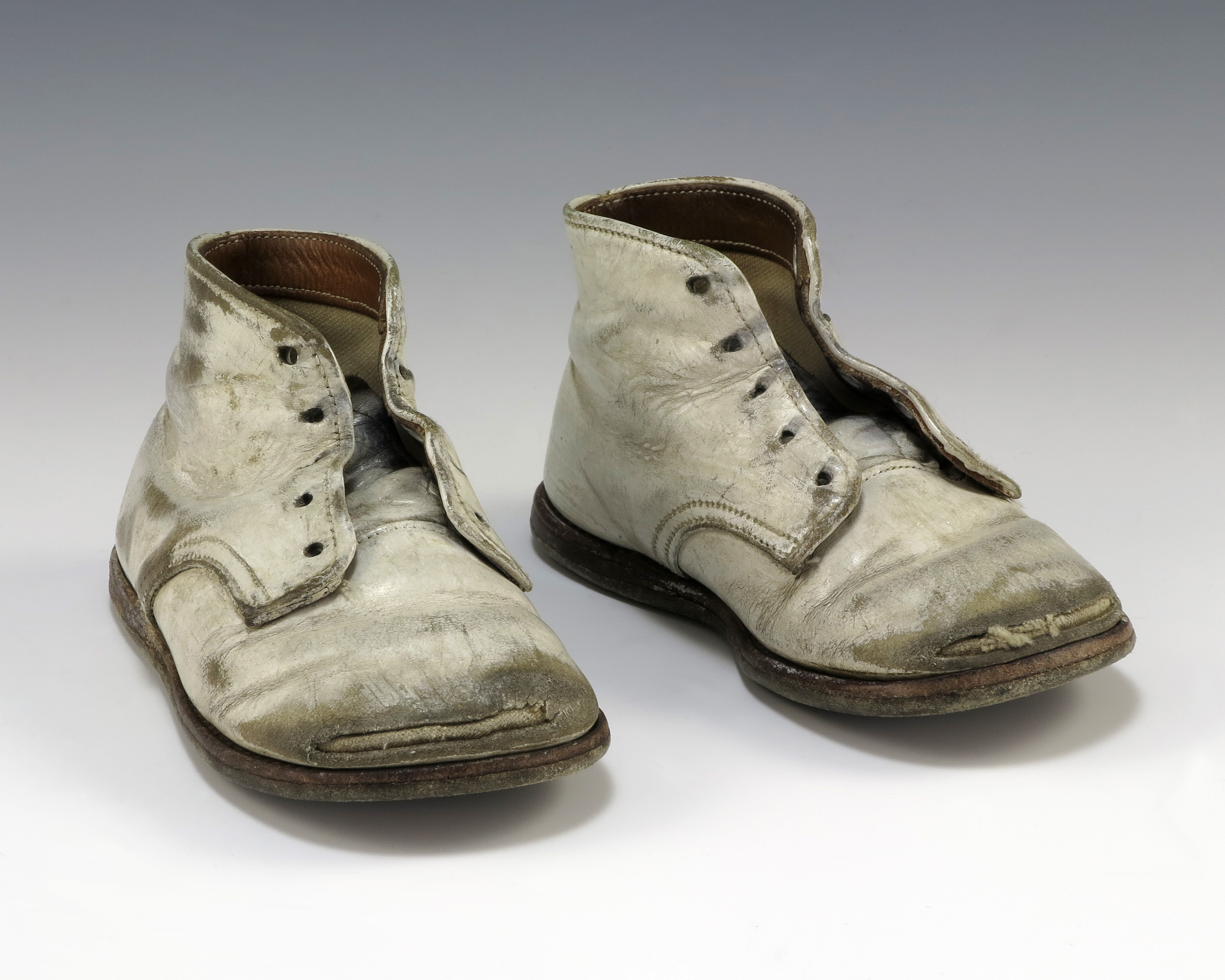
A pair of well-worn baby shoes worn by an orphan evacuated from Vietnam during Operation Babylift

On 3 April 1975, with the central Vietnamese city of Da Nang having fallen to North Vietnamese forces in March, and with the South Vietnamese capital Saigon coming under siege, U.S. president Gerald Ford announced that the U.S. government would begin airlifting orphans out of Saigon. The airlift would be carried out on a series of 30 planned flights aboard C-5A and C-141 cargo aircraft operated by the 62nd Airlift Wing, under the command of Major Gen. Edward J. Nash of Military Airlift Command (MAC).

The adoption agency Holt International, along with a number of service organizations including, Friends of Children of Viet Nam (FCVN), Friends For All Children (FFAC), Catholic Relief Service, International Social Services, International Orphans, and the Pearl S. Buck Foundation, petitioned the government to help evacuate the orphans residing in their facilities in South Vietnam. In their book, Silence Broken, International Orphans (now Childhelp) founders Sara O'Meara and Yvonne Fedderson chronicle the request they received from Lt. General Lewis William Walt to help with evacuations and finding homes for the Vietnamese-American orphans, many of whom had been fathered by American servicemen.

When American businessman Robert Macauley learned that it would take more than a week to evacuate the surviving orphans due to the lack of military transport planes, he chartered a Boeing 747 from Pan American World Airways and arranged for 300 orphaned children to leave the country, paying for the trip by mortgaging his house.

Frederick M. "Skip" Burkle Jr. served as the medical director of Operation Babylift. He gathered the orphans in Saigon, accompanied them to Clark AB (Air Base) in the Philippines, and continued to care for them on the Boeing 747 across the Pacific Ocean to Los Angeles and then Long Beach Naval Support Activity.

Flights continued until artillery attacks by the People's Army of Vietnam on Tan Son Nhut Airport rendered airplane flights impossible. Over 2,500 children were relocated and adopted out to families in the United States and its allies, including approximately 250 sent to Australia.

The operation was controversial because there were questions about whether the evacuation was in the children's best interest, and because not all the children were orphans.

== Plane crash ==
A C-5A Galaxy, serial number 68-0218, flew the initial mission of Operation Babylift departing from Tan Son Nhut Airport shortly after 4 p.m. on 4 April 1975. Twelve minutes after takeoff, there was what seemed to be an explosion as the lower rear fuselage was torn apart. The locks of the rear loading ramp had failed, causing the door to open and separate, and a rapid decompression. Control and trim cables to the rudder and elevators were severed, leaving only one aileron and wing spoilers operating. Two of the four hydraulic systems were out of service. The crew wrestled at the controls, managing some control of the plane through changes in throttle settings, as well as using the one working aileron and wing spoilers. The crew descended to an altitude of 1,200 m (4,000 ft) on a heading of 310 degrees in preparation for landing on Tan Son Nhut's runway 25L. About halfway through a turn to final approach, the rate of descent increased too rapidly. Seeing they could not make the runway, full power was applied to bring the nose up. The C-5 touched down briefly in a rice paddy, skidding for a quarter of a mile. Next, the aircraft became airborne again for a half mile before hitting a dike and breaking into four parts, some of which caught fire. According to DIA figures, 175 people survived and 138 people were killed in the crash, including 78 children and 35 Defense Attaché Office, Saigon personnel. After this crash, Major General Maurice F. Casey, the Deputy Director for Logistics in the Organization of the Joint Chiefs of Staff, called General Paul K. Carlton, MAC Commander, expressed his sympathy and then confirmed with the State that they wanted to continue these airlifts out of Saigon. Carlton acknowledged that he would use C-141 planes for the evacuations unless conditions forced him to use C-5As. As another added safety precaution, Carlton decided all flights would land and takeoff at Tan Son Nhut only during daylight hours.

== Criticism and legacy ==
On 29 April 1975, a lawsuit was filed by Vietnamese born nurse Muoi McConnell on behalf of an ad-hoc group known as the Committee to Protect the Rights of Vietnamese Children, alleging that many children transferred to the United States were not orphans, and were taken without the consent of parents and family members. Many children taken during the operation were placed in orphanages due to poor living conditions by living relatives, and sometimes allegedly under duress. These actions were labelled as kidnapping by periodicals of the time, citing the lack of consent and documentation behind the extraction of children alongside the lawsuit.

The Vietnamese adoptee-run nonprofit, Operation Reunite, used DNA testing to match adoptees with their Vietnamese families.

A memorial was unveiled in Holmdel, New Jersey, United States, in April 2015.

== See also ==
- Operation Peter Pan
