= Iberia Flight 933 =

1973 aviation accident in Massachusetts

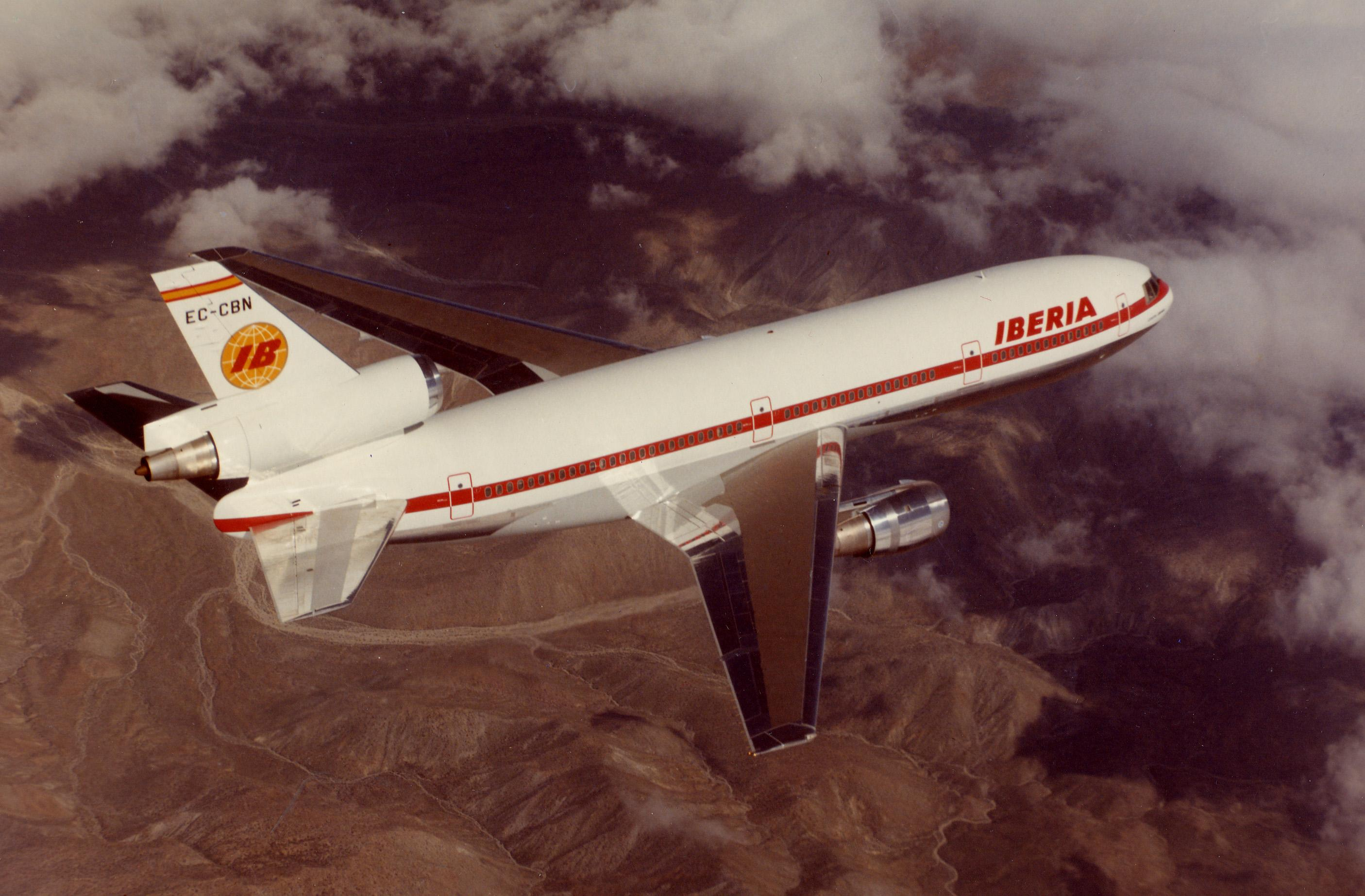
- EC-CBN, the aircraft involved in the accident

Accident
- Date: December 17, 1973
- Summary: Pilot error leading to spatial disorientation
- Site: Logan International Airport, Boston, Massachusetts, United States; 42°21′48″N 71°0′18″W

Aircraft
- Aircraft type: McDonnell Douglas DC-10-30
- Aircraft name: Costa Brava
- Operator: Iberia
- IATA flight No.: IB933
- ICAO flight No.: IBE933
- Call sign: IBERIA 933
- Registration: EC-CBN
- Flight origin: Madrid Barajas International Airport, Madrid, Spain
- Destination: Logan International Airport, Boston, Massachusetts, United States
- Occupants: 168
- Passengers: 154
- Crew: 14
- Fatalities: 0
- Injuries: 13
- Survivors: 168

Iberia Flight 933 was a flight from Madrid Barajas International Airport to Boston Logan International Airport in Boston that crash landed on December 17, 1973. As the McDonnell Douglas DC-10 operating the flight was approaching the airport, it collided with the approach lighting system (ALS) 500 feet (152 m) short of the runway threshold. The impact broke off the right main landing gear. The aircraft became airborne for about 1,200 feet (370 m), then landed on runway 33 Left, veered to the right off the runway and came to rest. All 168 on board survived, but the plane was written off. This accident was the first hull loss of the DC-10.

== Background ==
=== Aircraft ===
The aircraft involved was a McDonnell Douglas DC-10-30, manufactured in early 1973 by McDonnell Douglas at Long Beach Airport, California. At the time of the accident, it was nine months old and had flown a total of 2,016 flight hours. It was registered as N54627 during a certification test but re-registered as EC-CBN when it was delivered to Iberia Airlines in August 1973. It was photographed previously for Iberia Airlines postcards and merchandise.

=== Crew ===
The cockpit crew consisted of Captain Jesus Calderón Gaztelu (age 53), First Officer Alfredo Perez Vega (54), Flight Engineer Celedonio Martin Santos (42), and Radio Operator/Navigator Candido Garcia Bueno (51). Captain Calderón was hired in 1953 and had 21,705 flight hours, including 426 hours in the DC-10. First Officer Perez was hired in 1946 and had 34,189 hours, including 403 hours in the DC-10. Flight Engineer Martin was hired in 1952 and had 15,317 hours of flight time, including 263 hours in the DC-10. Radio Operator/Navigator Garcia was hired in 1941 and had 14,562 hours, including 384 hours in the DC-10.

== Investigation ==
The National Transportation Safety Board (NTSB) investigated the accident. According to the aircraft's flight data recorder, the descent rate was increasing too rapidly during the approach, the result of a wind shear encounter. The investigation found that the captain and the first officer failed to recognize the rate change until the aircraft collided with the ALS piers. It was also discovered that the changes in weather had directed their attention away from monitoring the descent rate. Eleven months after the accident, the NTSB issued its conclusion on the probable cause of the crash. In its accident report the NTSB stated: "The captain did not recognize and may have been unable to recognize, an increased rate of descent in time to arrest it before the aircraft struck the approach light piers. The increased rate of descent was induced by an encounter with low-level wind shear at a critical point in the landing approach where he was transitioning from automatic flight control under instrument flight conditions to manual flight control with visual references. The captain's ability to detect and arrest the increased rate of descent was adversely affected by a lack of information as to the existence of the wind shear and the marginal visual cues available. The minimal DC-10 wheel clearance above the approach lights and the runway threshold afforded by the ILS glide slope made the response time critical and, under the circumstances, produced a situation wherein a pilot's ability to make a safe landing was greatly diminished."

The DC-10 had eight emergency exits, but after the crash, only four could be operated. The number 1 right exit had a fault in the mechanism and could not be opened. Due to the weak floor at the end of the aircraft, the floor had become deformed, causing failures in multiple-seat tracks and restraints, and also destroyed the two emergency exits at the back of the aircraft. This meant that the passengers in the back had to climb out of the section through the roof that had broken and jump off onto the ground, causing even more injuries. Due to the floor disintegrating, rock and mud were thrown into the rear compartment of the aircraft.

The parts of the floor that had broken apart were between fuselage stations (sections in the aircraft fuselage) 1530 to 1850. Compared to American Airlines Flight 96, stations 1801 to 1921 had failed. The same floor section had collapsed in both accidents.

== Aftermath ==
The NTSB issued seven safety recommendations to the Federal Aviation Administration on September 6, 1974. All of them were closed and with acceptable action.

- A-74-77: RELOCATE AS SOON AS POSSIBLE ILS GLIDE SLOPE TRANSMITTER SITES IN ACCORDANCE WITH FAA ORDER 8260.24 TO PROVIDE A LARGER MARGIN OF SAFETY FOR WIDE-BODIED AIRCRAFT DURING CATEGORY I APPROACHES.

- A-74-78: AS AN INTERIM MEASURE, INCREASE DH AND VISIBILITY MINIMUMS FOR THOSE APPROACHES WHERE THE COMBINATION OF THE GLIDE SLOPE TRANSMITTER ANTENNA INSTALLATION AND THE AIRCRAFT GLIDE SLOPE RECEIVER ANTENNA INSTALLATION PROVIDE A NOMINAL WHEEL CLEARANCE OF LESS THAN 20 FEET AT THE RUNWAY THRESHOLD

- A-74-79: PENDING THE RELOCATION OF THE GLIDE SLOPE FACILITY TO COMPLY WITH FAA ORDER 8260.24, EXPEDITE THE MODIFICATIONS TO OFFICIAL U.S. INSTRUMENT APPROACH PROCEDURES SO THAT THEY DISPLAY GLIDE SLOPE RUNWAY THRESHOLD CROSSING HEIGHT FOR ALL APPROACHES HAVING A TCH OF LESS THAN 47 FEET.

- A-74-80: ISSUE AN ADVISORY CIRCULAR WHICH DESCRIBES THE WIND SHEAR PHENOMENON, HIGHLIGHTS THE NECESSITY FOR PROMPT PILOT RECOGNITION AND PROPER PILOTING TECHNIQUES TO PREVENT SHORT OR LONG LANDINGS, AND EMPHASIZES THE NEED TO BE CONSTANTLY AWARE OF THE AIRCRAFT\'S RATE OF DESCENT, ATTITUDE AND THRUST DURING APPROACHES USING AUTOPILOT/AUTOTHROTTLE SYSTEMS.

- A-74-81: MODIFY INITIAL AND RECURRENT PILOT TRAINING PROGRAMS AND TESTS TO INCLUDE A DEMONSTRATION OF THE APPLICANT\'S KNOWLEDGE OF WIND SHEAR AND ITS EFFECT ON AN AIRCRAFT\'S FLIGHT PROFILE, AND OF PROPER PILOTING TECHNIQUES NECESSARY TO COUNTER SUCH EFFECTS.

- A-74-82: EXPEDITE THE DEVELOPMENT, TESTING AND OPERATIONAL USE OF THE ACOUSTIC DOPPLER WIND MEASURING SYSTEM.

- A-74-83: DEVELOP AN INTERIM SYSTEM WHEREBY WIND SHEAR INFORMATION DEVELOPED FROM METEOROLOGICAL MEASUREMENTS OR PILOT REPORTS WILL BE PROVIDED TO THE PILOTS OF ARRIVING AND DEPARTING AIRCRAFT.

EC-CBN was damaged beyond repair and written off two months later. It was scrapped in 1974.

== See also ==
- Pan Am Flight 845 and Emirates Flight 407, similar accidents with collision with ALS system during takeoff roll
