= Tailstrike =

Contact of an aircraft tail with the ground or another object causing substantial damage

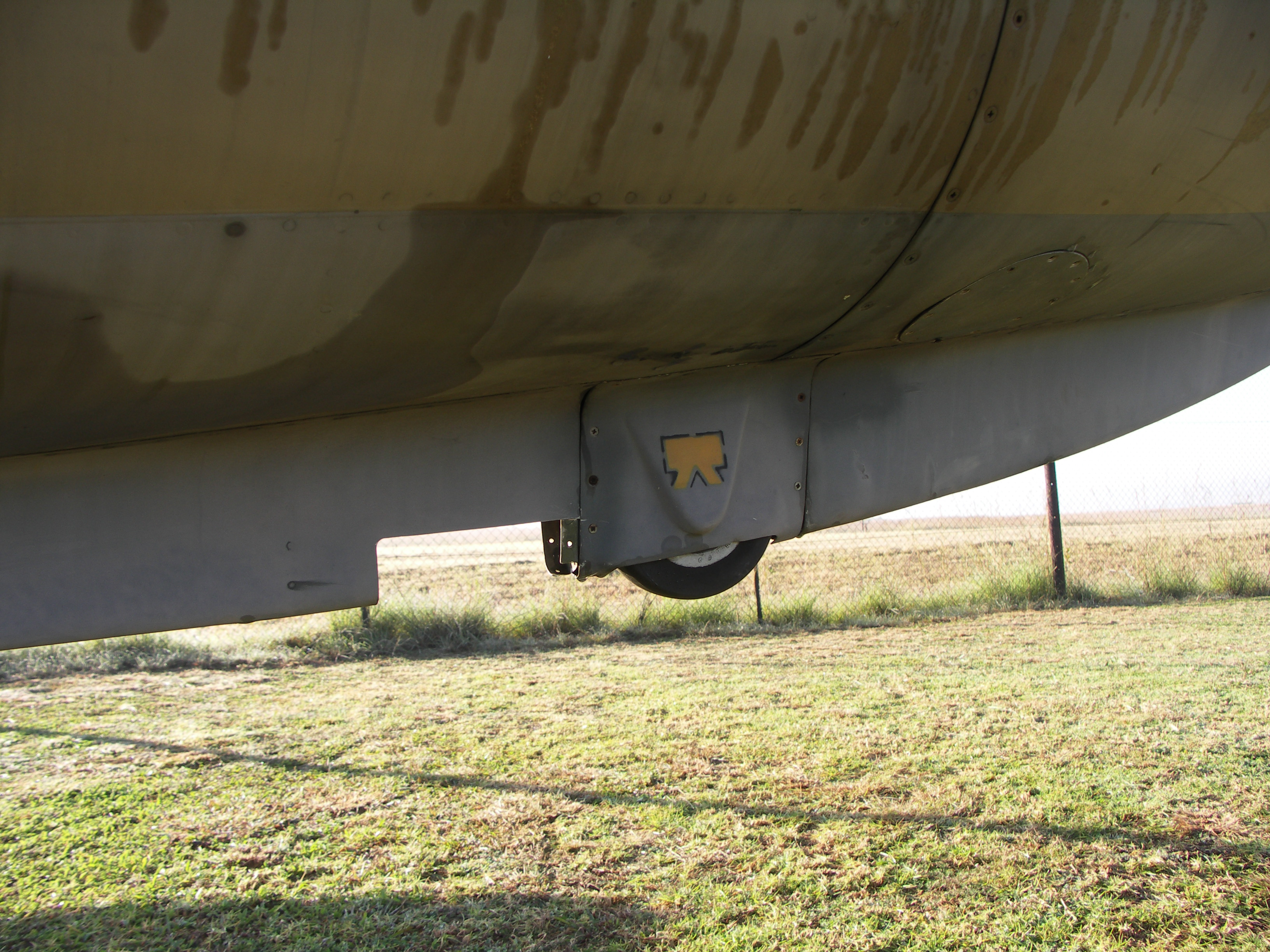
Tail wheel on an Aermacchi MB-326 to minimise damage caused by tailstrike

In aviation, a tailstrike or tail strike occurs when the tail or empennage of an aircraft strikes the ground or other stationary object. This can happen with a fixed-wing aircraft with tricycle undercarriage, in both takeoff where the pilot rotates the nose up too rapidly, or in landing where the pilot raises the nose too sharply during final approach, often in attempting to land too near the runway threshold. It can also happen during helicopter operations close to the ground, when the tail inadvertently strikes an obstacle.

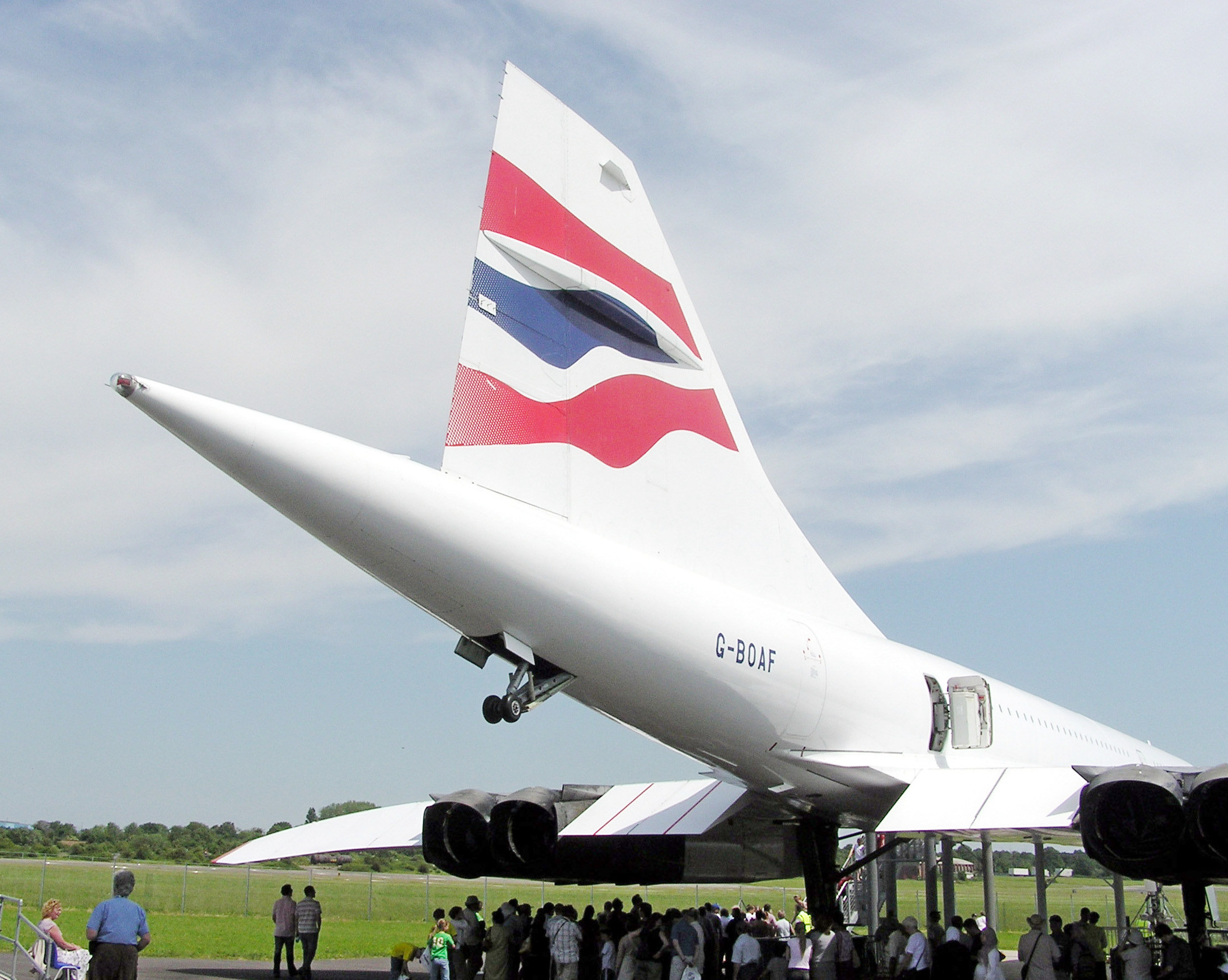
The tail bumper of Concorde G-BOAF at Filton, Bristol

A minor tailstrike incident may not be dangerous in itself, but the aircraft may still be weakened and must be thoroughly inspected and repaired if a more disastrous accident is to be avoided later in its operating life.

== Protection measures ==
Fixed-wing aircraft with a conventional tail and tricycle undercarriage are vulnerable to tailstrike. Those which require a high angle of attack on takeoff or landing are especially so. They may be fitted with a protection device such as a small tailwheel (Concorde and the Saab Draken), tailskid (Diamond DA20), or reinforced tail bumper. The device may be fixed or retractable.

== Incident management ==
Tailstrike incidents are rarely dangerous in themselves, but the aircraft must be thoroughly inspected and repairs may be difficult and expensive if the pressure hull is involved. Inadequate inspections and improper repairs to damaged airframes after a tailstrike have been known to cause catastrophic structural failure long after the tailstrike incident following multiple pressurization cycles.

== Examples of notable tailstrikes ==
- Emirates Flight 407, tailstrike on takeoff when correcting for insufficient thrust.
- Japan Air Lines Flight 123, improper repairs to a previous tailstrike on landing, resulting in catastrophic failure seven years later. The 520 fatalities made this the deadliest single-aircraft accident in aviation history.
- China Airlines Flight 611, improper repairs to a previous tailstrike on landing, resulting in catastrophic failure twenty-two years later.
- Air India Express Flight 611, severe tailstrike on takeoff following the collapse of the captain's backrest resulting in collision with the localizer antenna and perimeter wall.

== Helicopters ==
Tailstrikes can also happen with helicopters; an example of this is an Australian AW139 which on landing the rear tail hit vegetation. With helicopters a tail strike can mean that the tail rotor itself, boom, or tailfin are damaged by contact.

Another type of danger for helicopters that have a tail boom is that the main rotor and tail strike each other, which can cause the tail to be cut off and/or damage the main rotor blade.

== See also ==
- Wingstrike
