= Air India Express Flight 611 =

2018 aviation incident in India

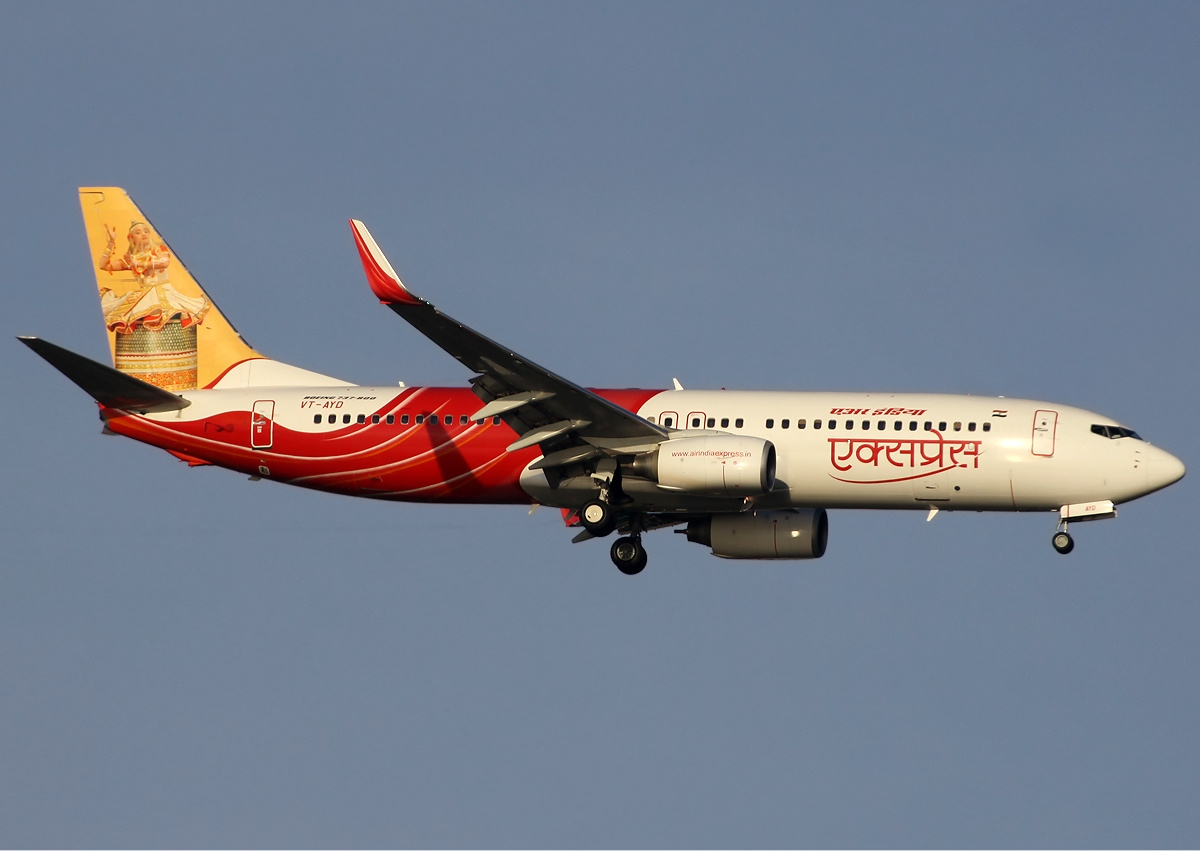
- VT-AYD, the aircraft involved in the incident, pictured in 2011

Incident
- Date: 11 October 2018
- Summary: Tailstrike due to captain's backrest collapsing and pilot error
- Site: Tiruchirappalli International Airport, Tamil Nadu, India; 10°45.94′N 78°42.90′E
- Total injuries: 1

Aircraft
- Aircraft type: Boeing 737-8HG (Note: The airliner was a Boeing 737-800 model. Boeing assigns a unique code for each company that buys one of its airliners, which is applied as a suffix to the model number at the time the aircraft is built, hence "737-8HG" designates a 737-800 built for Air India Express (customer code HG).)
- Operator: Air India Express
- IATA flight No.: IX611
- ICAO flight No.: AXB611
- Call sign: EXPRESS INDIA 611
- Registration: VT-AYD
- Flight origin: Tiruchirappalli International Airport, Tamil Nadu, India
- Destination: Dubai International Airport, United Arab Emirates
- Occupants: 136
- Passengers: 130
- Crew: 6
- Fatalities: 0
- Survivors: 136

Ground casualties
- Ground injuries: 1

Air India Express Flight 611 was an international flight from Tiruchirappalli, India, to Dubai, United Arab Emirates. On 11 October 2018, the Boeing 737-800, registration VT-AYD, operating the flight suffered a severe tail strike and crashed into the localizer antenna and perimeter wall, due to the captain's backrest collapsing on takeoff. The aircraft continued to fly towards the UAE. When it was nearing Oman, it was diverted to Mumbai, India, where it landed safely.

== Incident ==
Conditions were good, and the captain chose to take off from Runway 27. ATC granted Flight 611 takeoff clearance at 00:49 hours. The thrust was set to 98% for takeoff, and as is standard procedure, the captain placed his hand on the throttles ready to pull them closed in case of a rejected takeoff. Once the aircraft had accelerated to 117 knots (217 km/h; 135 mph), the backrest of the captain's seat suddenly collapsed. That caused him to inadvertently pull the throttles back, reducing thrust from 98% to 77%. The captain immediately called "your controls", giving the first officer control of the aircraft. Due to the sudden and unprecedented problem, the first officer failed to confirm the position of the throttles, a mandatory step if a pilot becomes incapacitated. Once he had recovered his position, the captain took back control of the aircraft with 2,000 feet (610 m) of runway left. Despite requiring more force than usual, the captain was able to rotate and the aircraft began to lift off with 1,000 feet (300 m) of runway still available. However, during the takeoff, the aircraft collided with the airport fence, an ILS antenna, and a brick wall. A motorist passing the brick wall was struck by debris and injured.

Once airborne, both pilots realized the aircraft was vibrating, which they attributed to wake turbulence and did nothing. Cabin crew at the rear of the aircraft felt a bump during takeoff and relayed that observation to the senior cabin crew at the first opportunity, although they believed the noise was caused by cargo moving. At the Trichy ATC Tower, operators become aware that the ILS Localizer was no longer working. Tower staff dispatched a crew to inspect the antenna, who discovered that it had been destroyed and that the one and a half meter-tall boundary wall had sustained significant damage, with parts of the aircraft skin embedded. The damage was found to be from the landing gear.

Flight 611 crew were informed of that by ATC at 00:56 but decided to proceed with the flight, in violation of the tailstrike protocol, which states that the aircraft must not be pressurized and must land at the nearest available airport. The crew maintained an altitude of 21,000 feet (6,400 m) while testing the landing gear and other systems. They soon requested to climb to 35,000 feet (11,000 m). Whilst the flight carried on towards Dubai, an Air India Express representative attended Tiruchirappalli Airport and inspected the damage done. Shortly thereafter, the company contacted the flight crew and instructed them to divert to Mumbai, despite the stricken aircraft being much closer to Dubai. Flight 611 touched down safely at Mumbai Airport at 05:38 hours, with the emergency services standing by.

After the aircraft had parked at a stand, an inspection found a large hole in the underside of the plane, with a light and VHF antenna having been ripped off, as well as damage to the landing gear, the left horizontal stabilizer, and the cowling of the number two engine.

== Investigation ==
The subsequent investigation found that the collapse of the captain's backrest was due to over-tightening of the reclining mechanism. The investigation also found that had the first officer implemented a rejected takeoff, the aircraft would have had sufficient runway to come to a stop safely. Had either the first officer or captain increased thrust back to 98%, Flight 611 would have taken off safely.

== See also ==
- Emirates Flight 407 - a tailstrike caused by too little thrust on takeoff.
