= Flight 933 =

Flight 933 may refer to

- Scandinavian Airlines System Flight 933, crashed on 13 January 1969
- Iberia Airlines Flight 933, runway incident on December 17, 1973
- Widerøe Flight 933, crashed on 11 March 1982
