= Pan Am Flight 845 =

1971 aviation accident in California

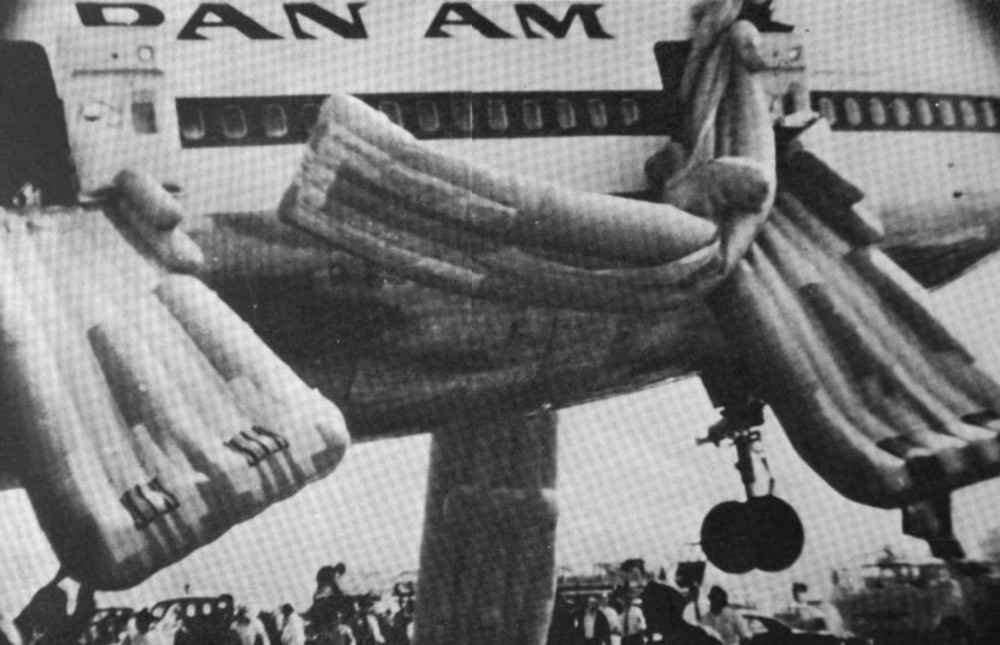
- Evacuation of the aircraft

Accident
- Date: July 30, 1971
- Summary: Struck structures past runway on takeoff due to pilot error
- Site: San Francisco Int'l Airport Millbrae, California United States

Aircraft
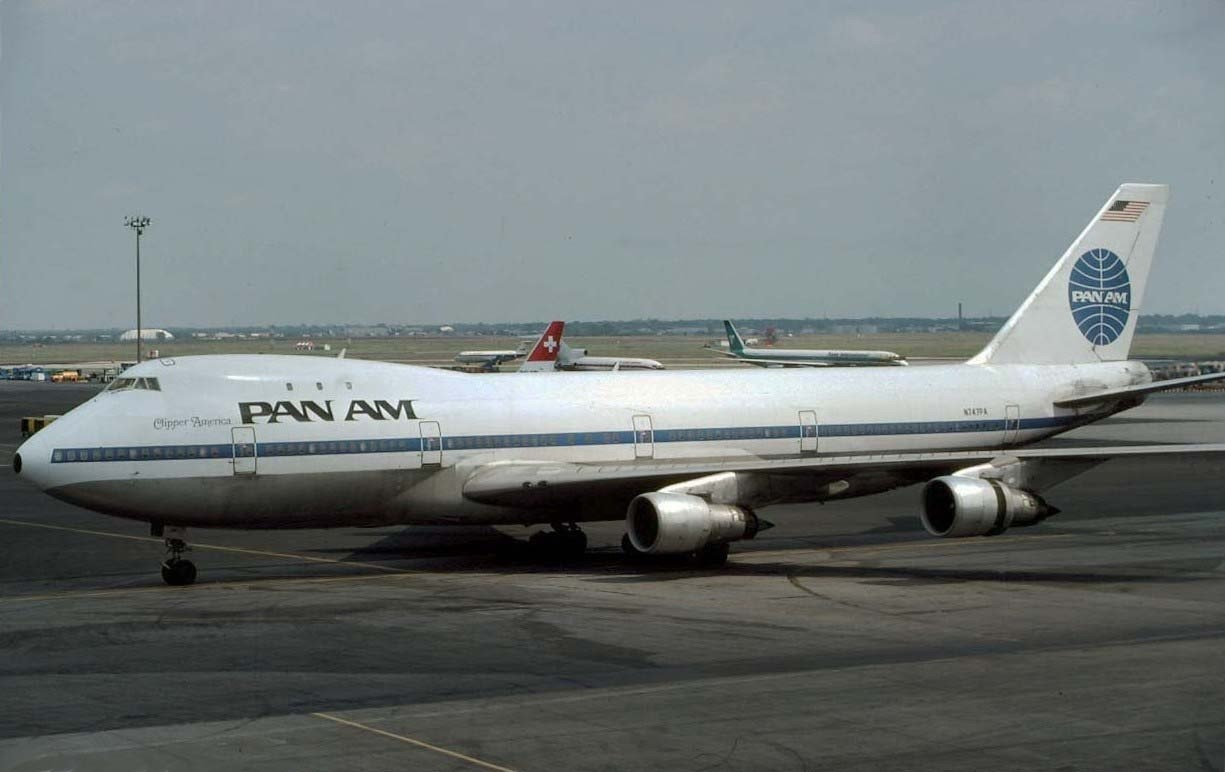
- N747PA, the aircraft involved in the accident, pictured in 1976 in a newer livery
- Aircraft type: Boeing 747-121
- Aircraft name: Clipper America
- Operator: Pan American World Airways
- IATA flight No.: PA845
- ICAO flight No.: PAA845
- Call sign: CLIPPER 845
- Registration: N747PA
- Flight origin: Los Angeles International Airport, Los Angeles, California, United States
- Stopover: San Francisco International Airport, San Francisco, California, United States
- Destination: Haneda Airport, Tokyo, Japan
- Occupants: 218
- Passengers: 199
- Crew: 19
- Fatalities: 0
- Injuries: 29
- Survivors: 218

Pan Am Flight 845 was a scheduled international passenger flight between Los Angeles and Tokyo, with an intermediate stop at San Francisco. The flight was operated by a Boeing 747 registered N747PA and named Clipper America.

On July 30, 1971, at 15:29 PDT, while it was taking off from San Francisco International Airport bound for Tokyo, the aircraft struck approach lighting system structures located past the end of the runway; this initial mishap seriously injured two passengers and caused significant physical damage to both the runway structures and the aircraft.

The crew continued the takeoff, flew out over the ocean, circled while dumping fuel, and returned to SFO. After coming to a stop, the crew ordered an emergency evacuation, during which 27 passengers were injured exiting the aircraft, eight of whom suffered serious back injuries. The accident was investigated by the National Transportation Safety Board (NTSB), which determined the probable cause was the pilot's use of incorrect takeoff reference speeds. The NTSB also found various procedural failures in the dissemination and retrieval of flight safety information, which had contributed to the accident.

== Aircraft and crew ==
The Boeing 747-121, registration N747PA, manufacturer's serial number 19639, first flew on April 11, 1969 and was delivered to Pan Am on October 3, 1970. It was the second 747 off Boeing's production line but was delivered nearly ten months after Pan Am's first 747 flight. Originally named Clipper America, it had logged 2,900 hours of operation at the time of the accident.

The flight crew of Flight 845 consisted of five — a captain, a first officer, a flight engineer, a relief flight engineer, and a relief pilot) The captain was Calvin Y. Dyer, a 57-year-old resident of Redwood City, California, a pilot with 27,209 hours of flying experience, 868 of which were on the 747. The first officer was Paul E. Oakes, a 40-year-old resident of Reno, Nevada, with 10,568 hours of experience, 595 on the 747. The flight engineer was Winfree Horne, who was 57 years old and from Los Altos, California, and had 23,569 hours of flight experience, 168 of them on the 747. The 34-year-old second officer, Wayne E. Sagar, was the relief pilot and had 3,230 hours of flight experience, 456 of them on the 747. The relief flight engineer was Roderic E. Proctor, a 57-year-old resident of Palo Alto, California, who had 24,576 flight hours, 236 of them on the 747.

On July 29, 1971, Dyer, Oakes, Horne, Sagar and Proctor had spent the whole day off-duty and had flown the initial Los Angeles to San Francisco leg of the flight.

== Accident history ==
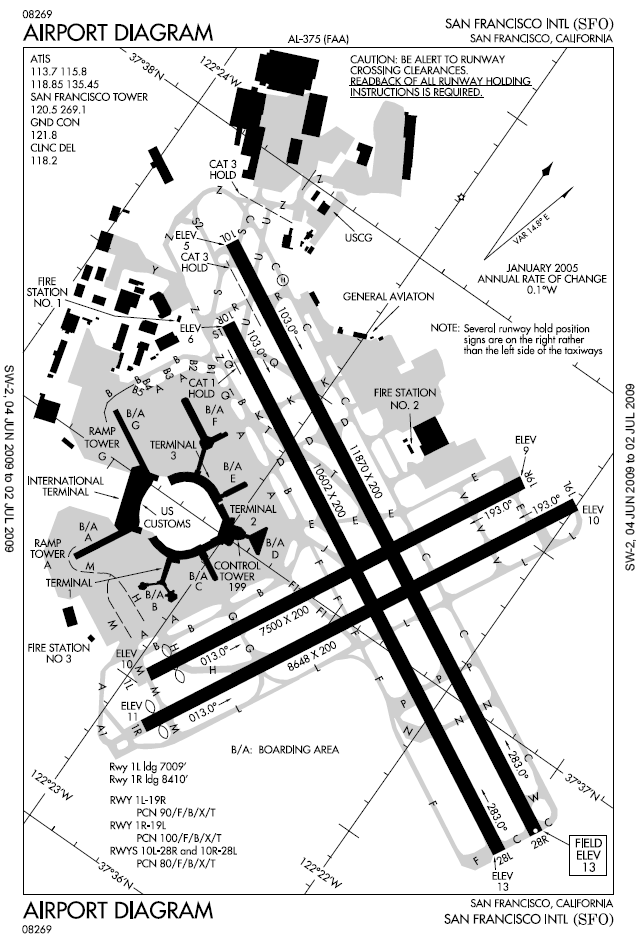
Modern San Francisco airport diagram showing runway layout (in 1971 runway 28R was more than 2,000 feet (610 m) shorter)

Flight 845's crew had planned and calculated its takeoff for runway 28L but discovered only after pushback that this runway had been closed hours earlier for maintenance, and that the first 1,000 feet (300 m) of runway 01R, the preferential runway at that time, (Note: For noise abatement.) had also been closed. After consulting with Pan Am flight dispatchers and the control tower, the crew decided to take off from runway 01R, shorter than 28L, with less favorable wind conditions.

Runway 01R was about 8,500 feet (2,600 m) long from its displaced threshold (from which point the takeoff was to start) to the end, which was the available takeoff length for Flight 845. Because of various misunderstandings, the flight crew was erroneously informed that the available takeoff length from the displaced threshold was 9,500 feet (2,900 m), or 1,000 feet (300 m) longer than actually existed. Despite the shorter length, it was later determined that the aircraft could have taken off safely if the proper procedures had been followed.

As the crew prepared for takeoff on the shorter runway, it selected 20 degrees of flaps, instead of the originally planned 10 degree setting, but did not recalculate the takeoff reference speeds (V_{1}, V_{r} and V_{2}), which had been calculated for the lesser flap setting and were thus too high for their actual takeoff configuration.

Consequently, the critical speeds were achieved late and the aircraft's takeoff roll was abnormally prolonged. In fact, the first officer called V_{r} at 160 knots (184 mph; 296 km/h), instead of the planned 164 knots (189 mph; 304 km/h), because the end of the runway was "coming up at a very rapid speed".

== Damage ==
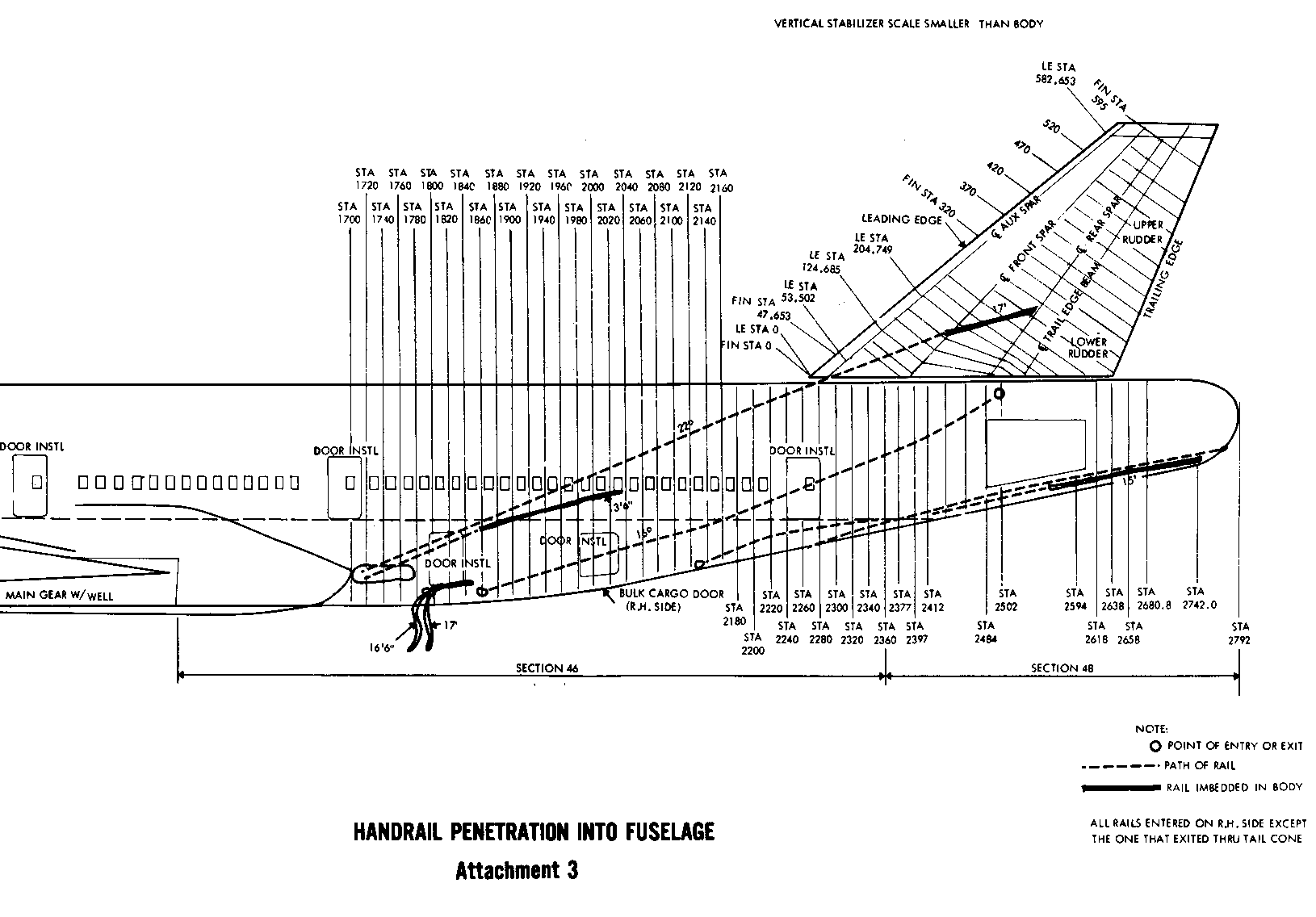
Diagram showing penetration of the Boeing 747's fuselage and tail by Approach Lighting System structures (from NTSB final report).

External videos
- Various angles of the incident on YouTube
- Amateur footage of the incident on YouTube

Unable to attain sufficient altitude to clear obstructions at the end of the runway, the aircraft had its aft fuselage, landing gear, and other structures damaged as it struck components of the approach lighting system (ALS) at over 160 knots (180 mph; 300 km/h). Three lengths of angle iron up to 17 feet (5.2 m) penetrated the cabin, injuring two passengers. The right main under-body landing gear was forced up and into the fuselage, and the left under-body landing gear was ripped loose and remained dangling beneath the aircraft. Other systems damaged in the impact included No. 1, 3, and 4 hydraulic systems, several wing and empennage control surfaces and their mechanisms, electrical systems including the antiskid control, and three of the evacuation slides.

The flight proceeded out over the Pacific Ocean for 1 hour and 42 minutes to dump fuel to reduce weight for an emergency landing. During that time, damage to the aircraft was assessed, and the injured were treated by doctors on the passenger list. After dumping fuel, the aircraft returned to the airport. Emergency services were deployed, and the plane landed on runway 28L. During landing, six tires on the under-wing landing gear failed. Reverse thrust functioned only on engine 4 and so the aircraft slowly veered to the right, off the runway, and came to a stop. The left under-wing landing gear caught fire, but the fire was extinguished by soil once the plane veered off the runway. After stopping, the aircraft slowly tilted backwards, because the body gear had been ripped off or disabled on takeoff. The aircraft came to rest on its tail with its nose elevated. Until the accident, it was not known that the 747 would tilt backwards without the support of the main body gear.

== Injuries ==
There were no fatalities among the 218 passengers and crew aboard, but two passengers were seriously injured during the impact, and during the subsequent emergency evacuation, 27 more sustained injuries, two of them seriously.

Lengths of angle iron from the ALS structure penetrated the passenger compartment, injuring passengers in seats 47G (near-amputation of left leg below the knee) and 48G (severe laceration and crushing of left upper arm).

After landing, the aircraft veered off the runway on its damaged landing gear and came to a halt. Evacuation commenced from the front, because the evacuation order was not broadcast over the cabin address system, instead erroneously broadcast over the radio, the order being given by one of the flight crew exiting the cockpit and noticing that evacuation had not commenced. During that time, the aircraft settled aft, resting on its tail in a nose-up attitude. The four forward slides were unsafe for use because of the greater elevation and high winds. Most passengers evacuated from the rear six slides. Eight passengers using the forward slides sustained serious back injuries and were hospitalized. Other passengers suffered minor injuries such as abrasions and sprains.

== Investigation ==
The accident was investigated by the NTSB, which issued its final report on May 24, 1972. The NTSB found the probable cause of the accident:

...the pilot's use of incorrect takeoff reference speeds. This resulted from a series of irregularities involving: (1) the collection and dissemination of airport information; (2) aircraft dispatching; and (3) crew management and discipline; which collectively rendered ineffective the air carrier's operational control system.

== Aftermath ==
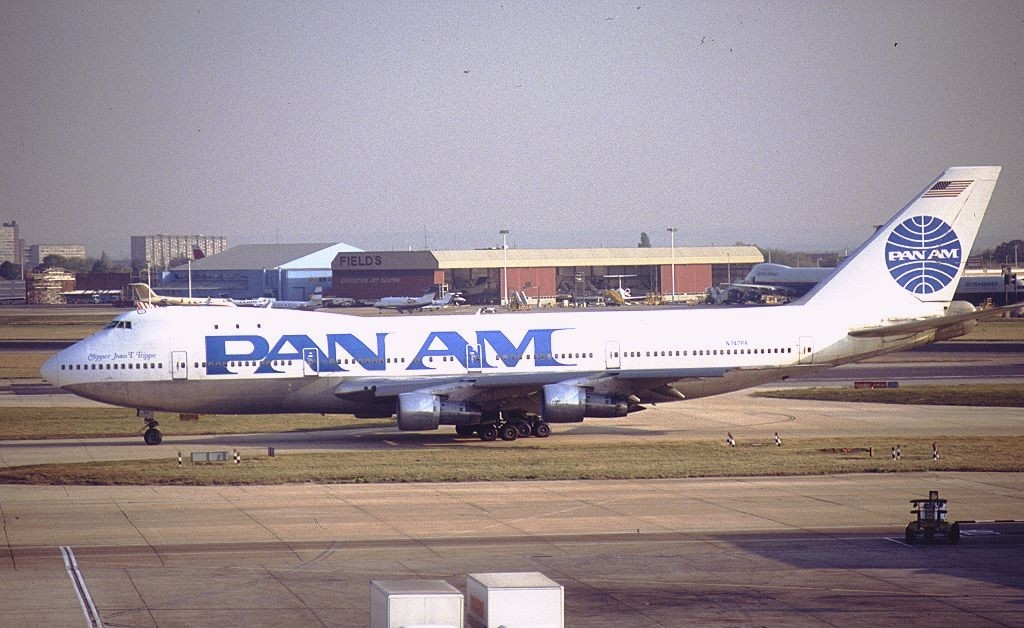
N747PA at Heathrow Airport in 1989

After the accident, the aircraft was repaired and returned to service. N747PA was re-registered and leased to Air Zaïre as N747QC from 1973 to March 1975, when it was returned to Pan Am, and it was renamed Clipper Sea Lark and then Clipper Juan T. Trippe in honor of the airline's founder. It remained with Pan Am until the airline ceased operations in 1991 and was transferred to Aeropostal and then briefly to Kabo Air of Nigeria and back to Aeropostal, and it was finally cut into pieces in 1999 at Norton AFB in San Bernardino, California, where it had been stored since at least 1997.

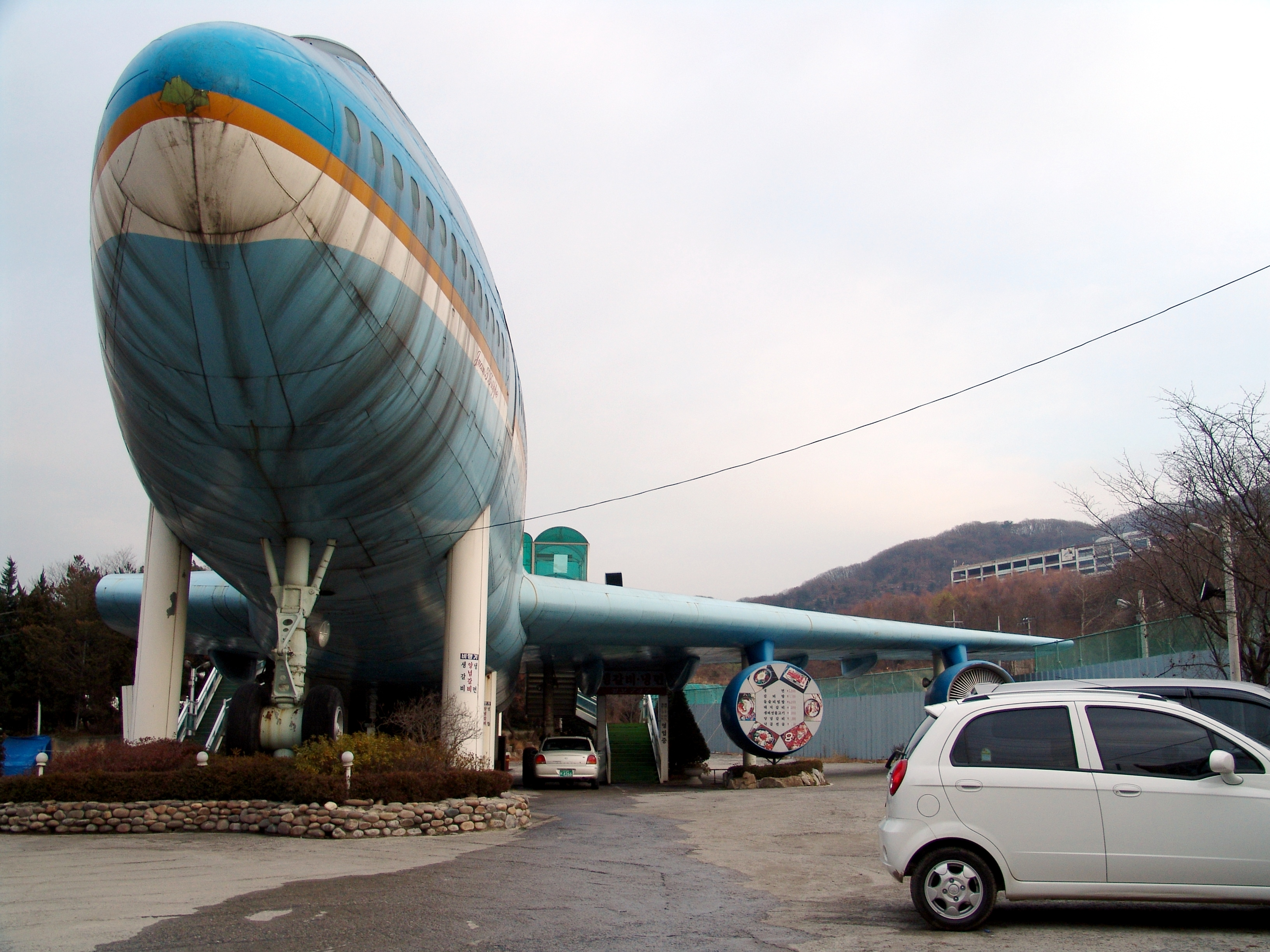
The aircraft, in Namyangju, South Korea, where it was converted into a restaurant.

The parts of the aircraft were shipped to Hopyeong, Namyangju, South Korea, and reassembled to serve as a restaurant for some time until it closed down. Petitions and campaigns from numerous aviation enthusiasts for museums or local governments then occurred to preserve the historical airplane. The aircraft was scrapped in 2010.

In 2017, Airways Magazine made an article claiming that N747PA had only partially been scrapped and that three major pieces of fuselage were saved and moved not far away to the suburb of Wolmuncheon-ro. The former aircraft was then reported to be used as a church in a Korean Air livery. (Location:1052-7 Wolmun-ri, Wabu-eup, Namyangju-si, Gyeonggi-do, South Korea). The claim was proven false, however, as the 747 claimed to be N747PA had been there long before the aircraft had been scrapped. As of 2020, the unknown church 747 had been removed as well and replaced by a new building.

== See also ==
- MK Airlines Flight 1602 (2004) and Emirates Flight 407 (2009) — Two other runway overrun accidents involving improperly calculated takeoff thrust
- List of accidents and incidents involving commercial aircraft
