= Wingstrike =

Type of aviation incident

Wingstrike is contact between an aircraft's wing and the ground during takeoff or landing, most often as a complication of a crosswind landing.

Unexpected gusts of wind may cause an aircraft to roll to one side or the other during landing, whether they are performing a crosswind landing or not.

However, crosswind landings have a much more complex dynamic relationship between the wind and the aircraft attitude. Because the wind is blowing across the runway, the aircraft has to either roll or yaw into the wind to be able to approach down the runway's centerline. As the aircraft transitions from descent to touchdown, the roll and/or yaw have to be countered to land smoothly and stay on the runway. This transition can cause upsets, particularly in gusting wind.

Damage from wingstrike can range from replacement of wing surface skin areas at the wingtip, to structural damage throughout the wing due to overloads.

== Vulnerability ==
The risk for wingstrike primarily depends on the angle of the line between the tip of the wing and the landing gear. The position of the landing gear, when calculating that line, should be at the point that it is maximally compressed, for example if the aircraft comes down off center and with its weight entirely on the downwind gear. The maximum safe angle would be slightly less than that angle - at that angle, the wing will probably hit the runway.

Dynamic flexing of the wing due to landing touchdown loads can also cause wingstrikes.

High wing aircraft, where the wing is located on top of the fuselage, are configured more safely from a wing strike perspective. Low wing aircraft have the wing closer to the ground.

=== Nacelle strike ===
Some aircraft have an engine nacelle (pod) which extends below the line between the landing gear and the wingtip. In this case, the aircraft may be vulnerable to nacelle strike as well as wingstrike, for the same reasons.

== See also ==
- Tailstrike
