= N747PA =

Boeing 747-121

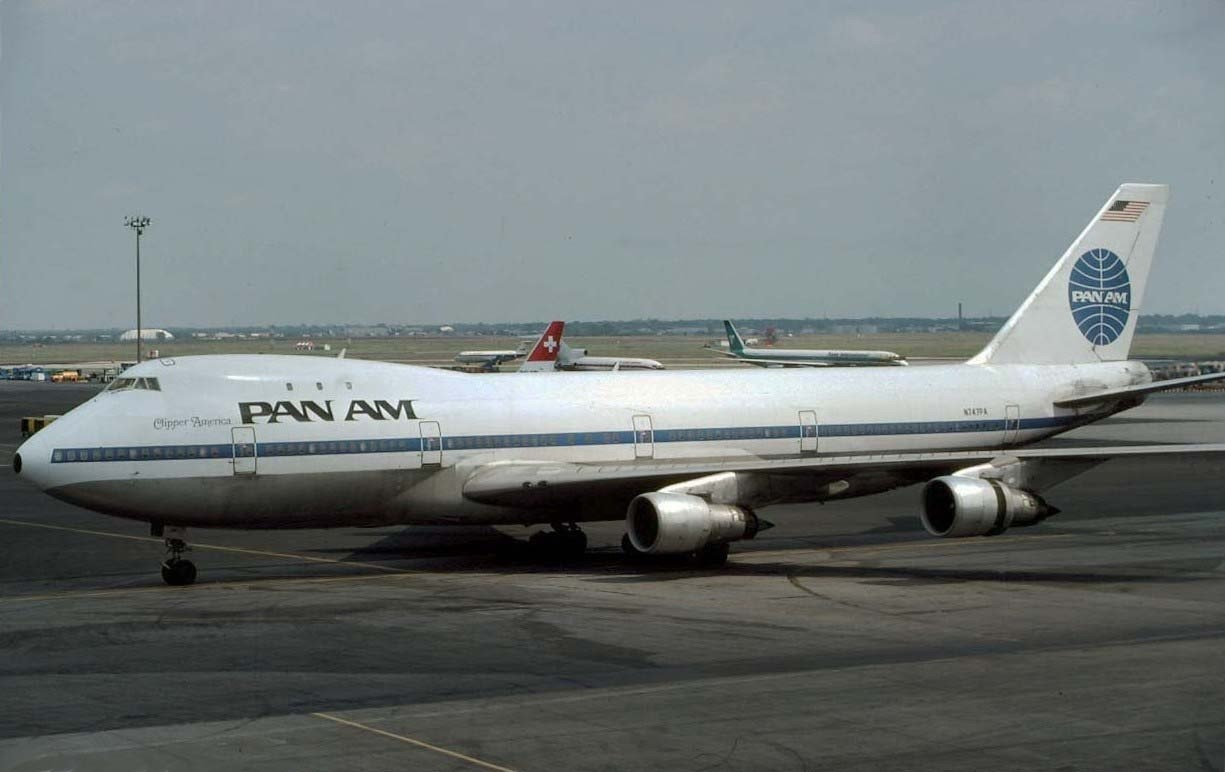
- N747PA at John F. Kennedy International Airport in 1976

General information
- Other names: Jet Clipper America (1970–1973); Mont Floyo (1973–1975); Clipper Sea Lark (1975–1980); Clipper Juan T. Trippe (1980–2010)
- Type: Boeing 747-121 (Note: The 1 in the suffix denotes that it was a -100 series variant of the 747; 21 is the Boeing customer code for Pan Am.)
- Manufacturer: Boeing Aircraft Company
- Status: Scrapped
- Owners: Pan Am (1970–1973, 1975–1991); Air Zaïre (1973–1975); Aeroposta (1992–1993); Kabo Air (1993)
- Registration: N747PA

History
- First flight: February 28, 1969
- In service: October 3, 1970

N747PA was the registration of a Boeing 747-121. Also known as "Clipper Juan T. Trippe", it was the second 747 ever built and was purchased by Pan Am on October 3, 1970. Following an accident in 1971, the aircraft continued service with Pan Am until the airline's collapse in 1991. It served as a freighter until 1997 when it was used as a source of spare parts. In 2000, it was purchased by a South Korean couple and converted into a restaurant. After laying abandoned for years following the restaurant's failure in 2005, the aircraft was finally scrapped in 2010.

== Aircraft history ==
N747PA was completed on February 28, 1969. Originally registered as N732PA, it was re-registered to N747PA early on. The aircraft was used by Boeing for flight testing before being delivered to Pan Am, which immediately sent it out on an extensive promotional tour across the United States and the rest of the world to showcase the 747 to the public. On January 14, 1970, then First Lady Pat Nixon, christened the aircraft, "Jet Clipper America" at a ceremony at Dulles International Airport. The aircraft joined Pan Am's fleet later that year. With its easy to recognize registration, N747PA became one of the most easily recognized and iconic planes in the Pan Am fleet, even being referred to by some as the airline's de facto flagship aircraft.

== Pan Am Flight 845 ==
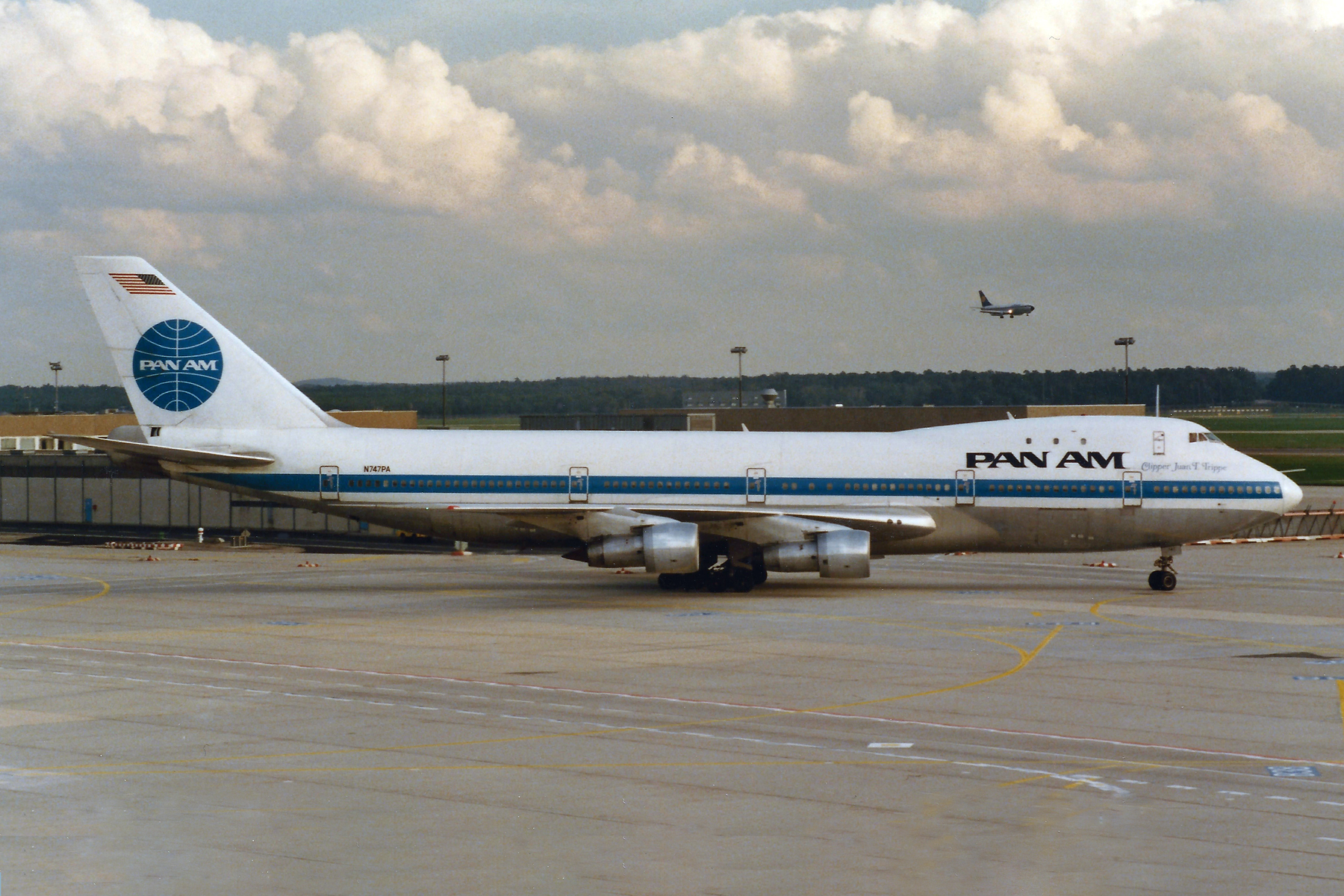
N747PA at Frankfurt Airport in 1984, more than 12 years after the accident

On July 30, 1971, while operating as Pan Am Flight 845, N747PA struck an approach lighting system while taking off from San Francisco International Airport. The crew had planned and calculated their takeoff for runway 28L but discovered only after pushback that the runway had been closed hours earlier for maintenance and that the first 1,000 feet (300 m) of runway 01R, the preferential runway at that time, had also been closed. After consulting with Pan Am flight dispatchers and the control tower, the crew decided to take off from runway 01R, shorter compared to 28L, with less favorable wind conditions.

Runway 01R was about 8,500 feet (2,600 m) long from its displaced threshold (from which point the takeoff was to start) to the end, which was the available takeoff length for Flight 845. Because of various misunderstandings, the flight crew was erroneously informed the available takeoff length from the displaced threshold was 9,500 feet (2,900 m), or 1,000 feet (300 m) longer than actually existed. Despite the shorter length, it was later determined that the aircraft could have taken off safely had the proper procedures been followed.

As the crew prepared for takeoff on the shorter runway, they selected 20 degrees of flaps instead of their originally planned 10-degree setting but did not recalculate their takeoff reference speeds (V_{1}, V_{r} and V_{2}), which had been calculated for the lower flap setting, and were thus too high for their actual takeoff configuration.

Consequently, these critical speeds were called late, and the aircraft's takeoff roll was abnormally prolonged. In fact, the first officer called V_{r} at 160 knots (300 km/h; 180 mph) instead of the planned 164 knots (304 km/h; 189 mph) because the end of the runway was "coming up at a very rapid speed."

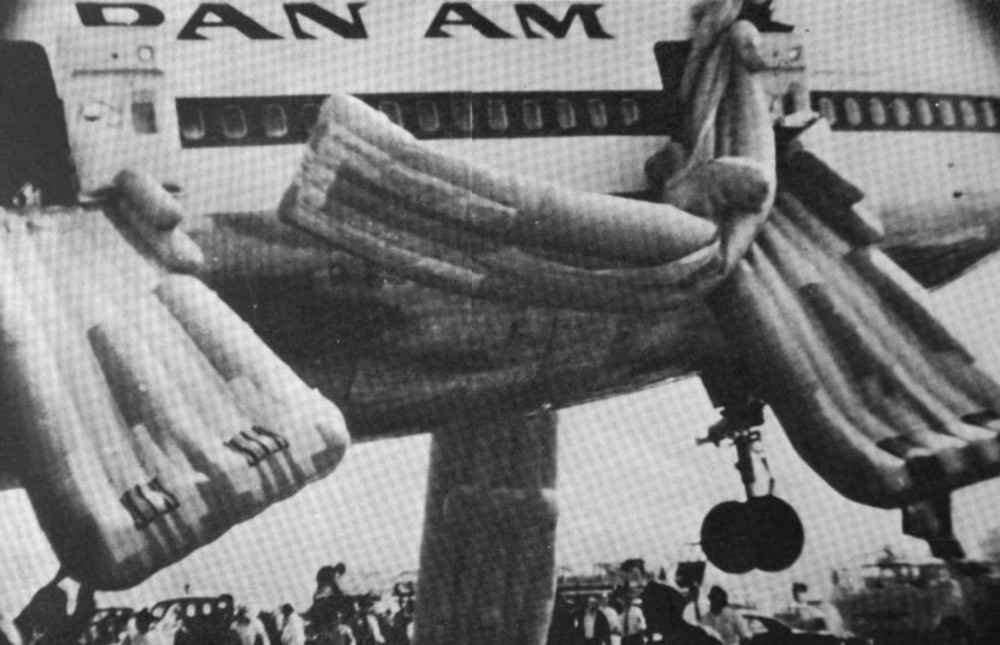
After the emergency landing, the nose of the 747 elevated upwards

One of the light beams penetrated the cabin and injured two passengers, with one having his foot nearly amputated. The right main under-body landing gear was forced into the fuselage, while the left gear was ripped loose and left dangling. Three of the four hydraulic systems were taken out, as well as several wing and control surfaces, antiskid control and three evacuation slides. The aircraft landed back in San Francisco after dumping fuel. Due to the missing landing gear and shift in the center of gravity from dumping fuel, N747PA settled on its tail with the nose up. In total, there were 29 injuries, with 8 requiring hospitalization.

The National Transportation Safety Board concluded that pilot error was the cause of the accident, citing the crew's incorrect input of takeoff reference speeds and the unusual nature of the events that led up to the collision.

== Later history ==
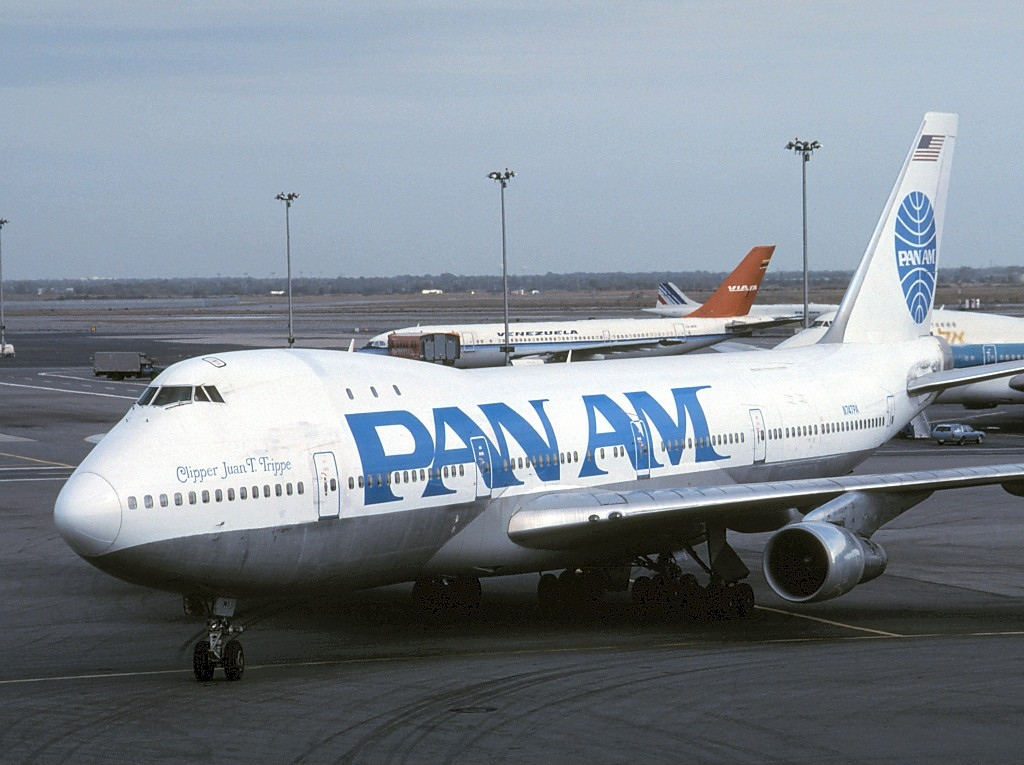
N747PA at John F. Kennedy International Airport in 1990

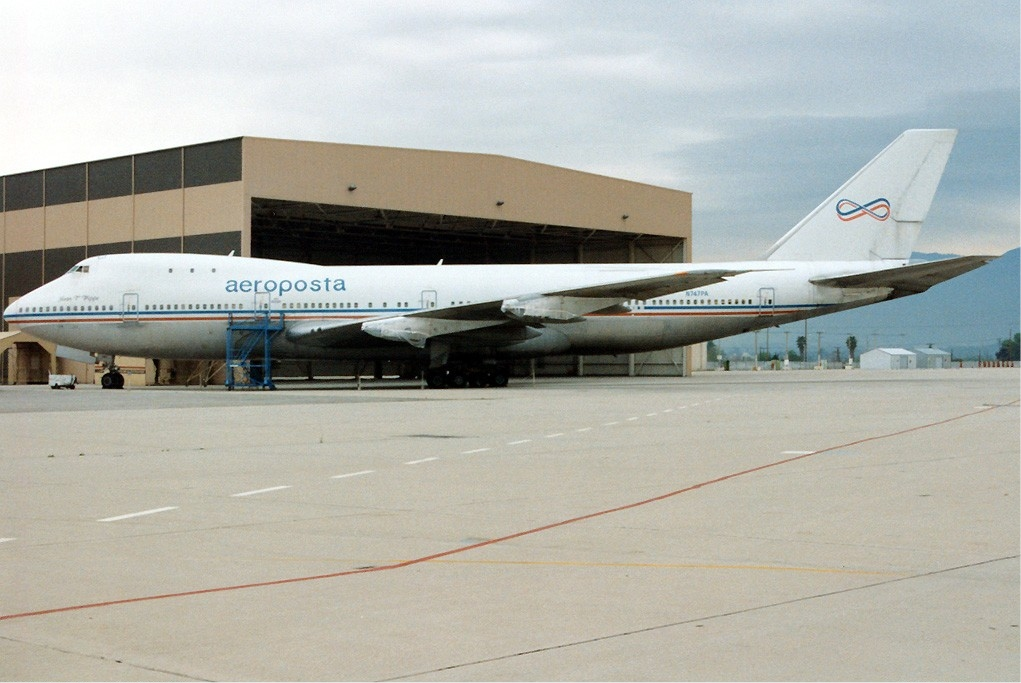
N747PA in 1995, after installation of the side cargo door (aft of the wing). In that moment it was in service with Aeroposta.

After the accident, the aircraft was repaired and returned to service with Pan Am shortly after. In 1973 it was re-registered to N747QC and leased to Air Zaïre, who renamed it to Mont Floyo. It returned to Pan Am in 1975, and was renamed to "Clipper Sea Lark" in 1980, and then "Clipper Juan T. Trippe" in 1981 in honor of the founder of Pan Am, Juan T. Trippe, following his death that year. In 1988, the aircraft received a side cargo door and reinforced floor as part of the United States Department of Defense's airlift requirements under the Civil Reserve Air Fleet.

When Pan Am ceased operation on December 4, 1991, General Electric Credit Corporation took ownership of N747PA. It was the last 747 Pan Am had left when it departed John F. Kennedy International Airport on May 12, 1992. It was leased to Argentinean airline Aeroposta and briefly later to Kabo Air in 1993. The aircraft would be grounded in 1997 and used as a source of spare parts, due to her airframe approaching the need for a major D-Check and no longer conforming to new noise criteria. Eventually, it was broken up in December 1999 at San Bernardino International Airport.

== "Jumbo 747" ==
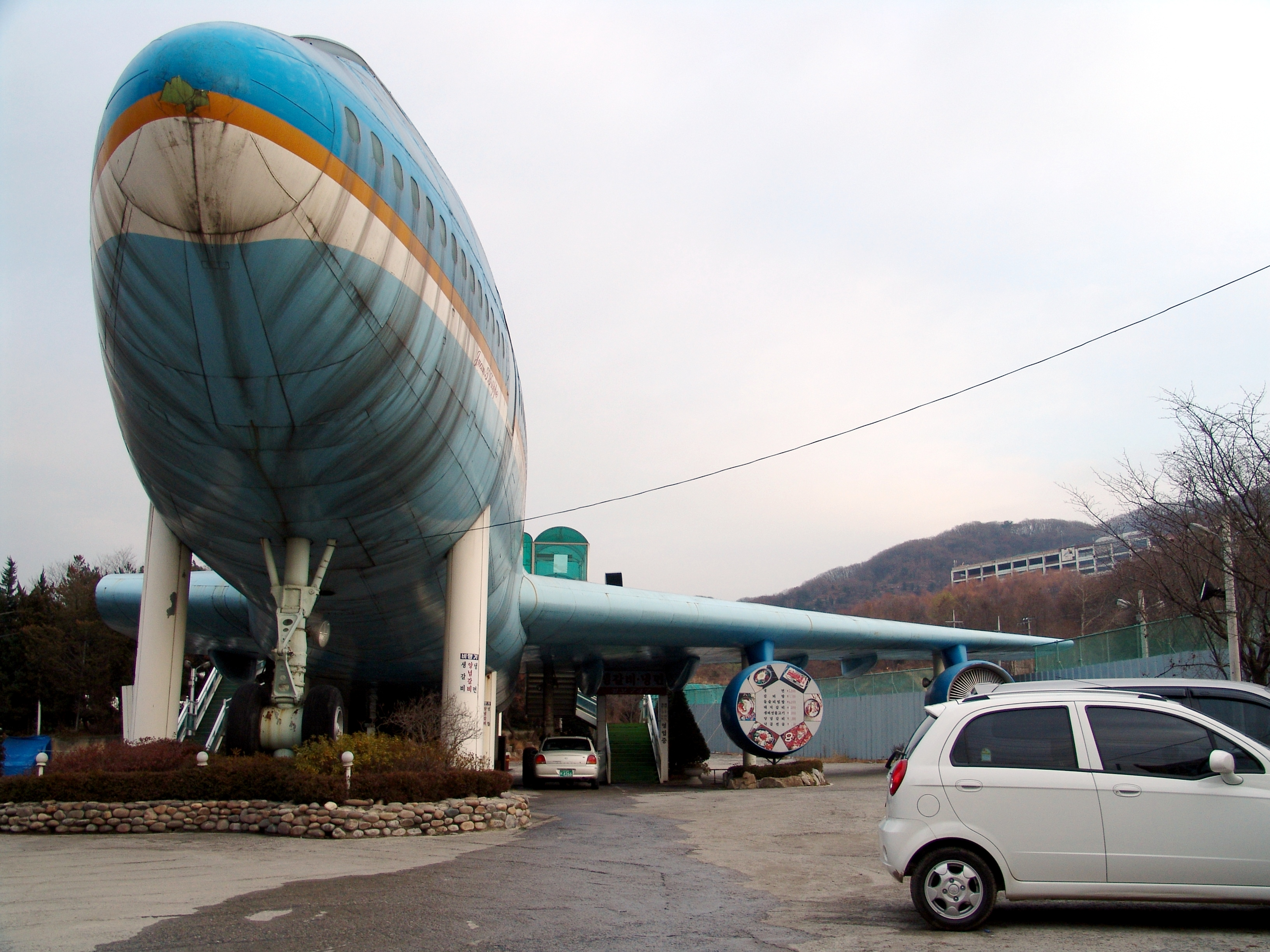
N747PA in its final state in 2005

In early 2000, the remains of the aircraft were purchased by a South Korean couple and converted into a restaurant called "Jumbo 747". Located in Hopyeong, Namyangju, South Korea, the plane was painted to look like a Boeing VC-25A (Air Force One). The restaurant failed in 2005, and the plane would lie abandoned for several years. After the restaurant shut down, there were petitions and campaigns from numerous aviation enthusiasts for museums or local governments to preserve the historical airplane. In December 2010, the remains of N747PA were finally scrapped.

In 2017, author Cody Diamond published in Airways an article claiming that N747PA had only partially been scrapped and that three major pieces of fuselage were saved and moved not far away to the suburb of Wolmuncheon-ro. The former aircraft was then reported to be used as a church in a Korean Air Livery. (Location:1052-7 Wolmun-ri, Wabu-eup, Namyangju-si, Gyeonggi-do, South Korea). However, this claim was proven incorrect, as the 747 claimed to be N747PA had been there long before the aircraft had been scrapped. As of 2020, the unknown church 747 had been removed as well and replaced by a new building.
