= Crosswind landing =

Going from flight to surface amid strong air currents angled from the runway

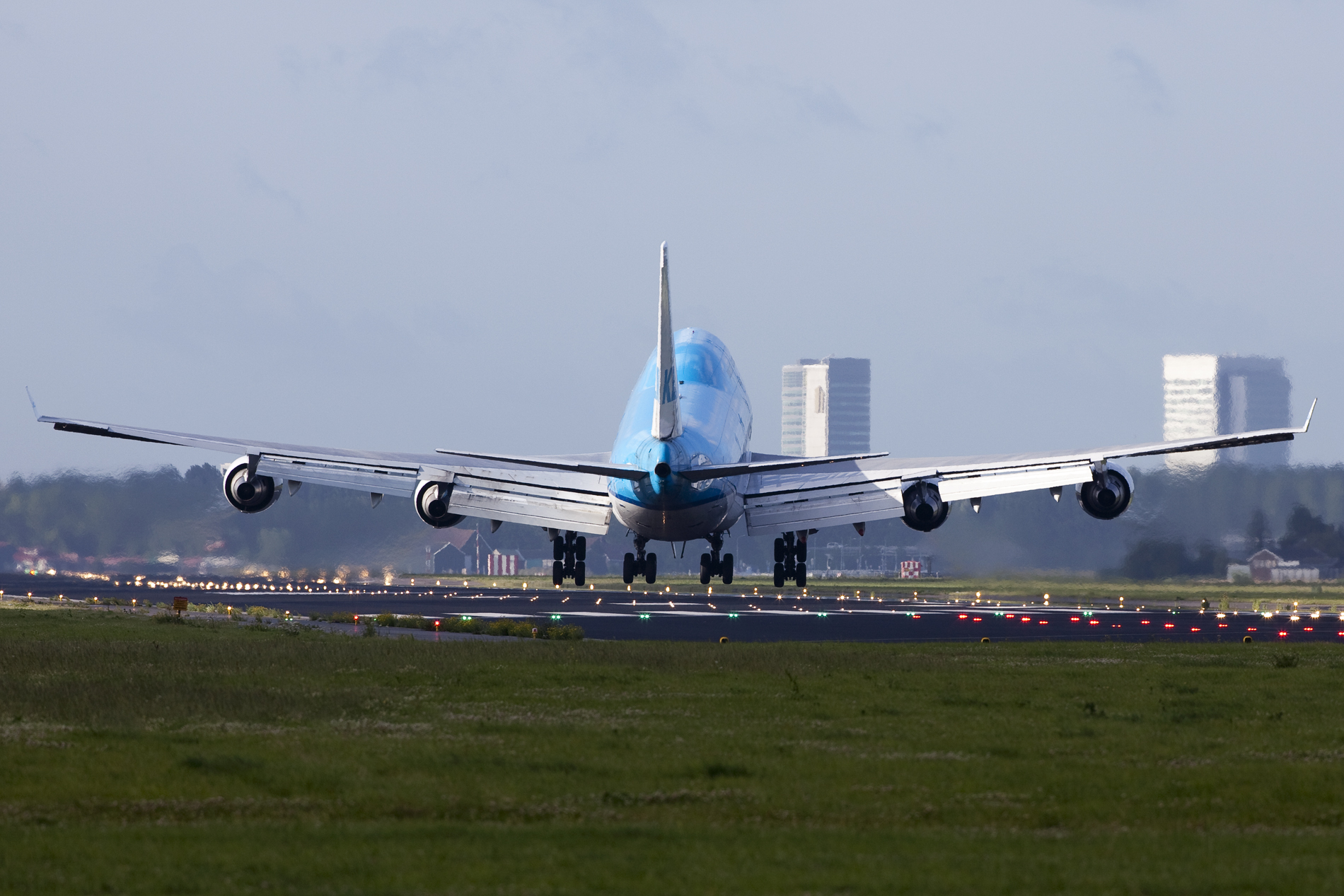
A KLM B747 heavy crosswind landing at Schiphol

In aviation, a crosswind landing is a landing maneuver in which a significant component of the prevailing wind is perpendicular to the runway center line.

== Significance ==
Aircraft in flight are subject to the direction of the winds in which the aircraft is operating. For example, an aircraft in flight that is pointed directly north along its longitudinal axis will, generally, fly in that northerly direction. However, if there is a west wind, the actual track of the aircraft will be slightly to the east of north. If the aircraft were landing north on a north-south runway, it would need to compensate for this easterly drift caused by the west crosswind.

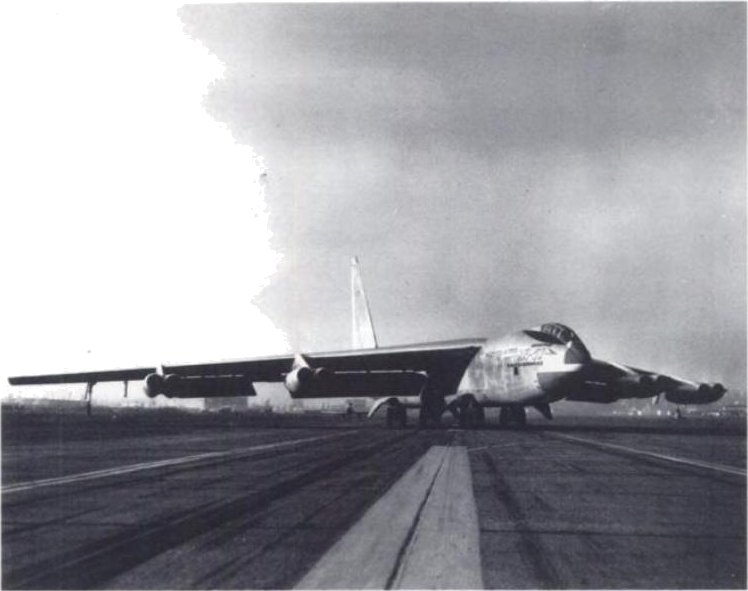
XB-52 performing a crab landing having nose pointed toward incoming wind, but undercarriage aligned along the runway

In situations where a crosswind is present, the aircraft will drift laterally as it approaches the runway. This drift poses significant safety issues because safe operation of the undercarriage requires the body and track of the aircraft to be aligned with the runway at touch down. The landing gear designs of the "pioneer era" 1909 Bleriot XI, and the much later Cold War B-52 strategic jet heavy bomber, were designed and each built with an unusual feature to counteract the problem: with the B-52, all four of its landing gear bogies could be steered, allowing the aircraft to land with the wheels facing the direction of travel even if the nose was not pointed in the same direction. The Bleriot XI had pivoting main gear legs, which passively allowed the main gear wheels to castor together about each of their vertical axes as a unit to allow small-angle crosswind landings, with bungee-cord loaded rigging members between the lower ends of the main wheel forks, to bring the wheels back to a "directly-ahead" orientation after touchdown.

If the crosswind landing is not executed safely, the aircraft may experience a wingstrike, where a wing hits the runway.

== Techniques ==
The following guidelines are advised by Boeing for a crosswind landing. These guidelines assume steady wind (no gusting). These winds are measured at 10 metres (33 ft) tower height for a runway 45 metres (148 ft) in width. Basically, there are three landing techniques which may be used to correct for cross winds: de-crab, crab, and sideslip.

=== De-crab ===
De-crab

The objective of this technique is to maintain wings level and the aircraft position near the runway centerline during approach. The nose points into the wind so that the aircraft approaches the runway slightly skewed with respect to the runway centerline (crabbing). This gives the impression of approaching the runway flying sideways, which can be disorienting for the pilot. Position is maintained by balancing the crosswind component, or more accurately the drag force arising from it, with engine thrust. Wings are maintained level throughout the approach. Just before the flare, opposite rudder (downwind rudder) is applied to eliminate the crab, with a simultaneous application of opposite aileron to maintain a wings-level attitude, so that at touch down, the body, velocity vector, and bank angle are all aligned with the runway, and the aircraft is positioned near the center.

=== Crab ===
Crab

The airplane can land using crab only (zero side slip) up to the landing crosswind guideline.

On dry runways, upon touchdown the airplane tracks towards the upwind edge of the runway while de-crabbing to align with the runway. Immediate upwind aileron is needed to ensure the wings remain level while rudder is needed to track center line. The greater the amount of crab at touchdown, the larger the lateral deviation from the point of touchdown. For this reason, touchdown in a crab only condition is not recommended when landing on a dry runway.

On very slippery runways, landing the airplane using crab only reduces drift towards the downwind side of a touchdown, and may reduce pilot workload since the airplane does not have to be de-crabbed before touchdown. However, proper rudder and upwind aileron must be applied after touchdown to ensure directional control is maintained.

=== Sideslip ===
Sideslip

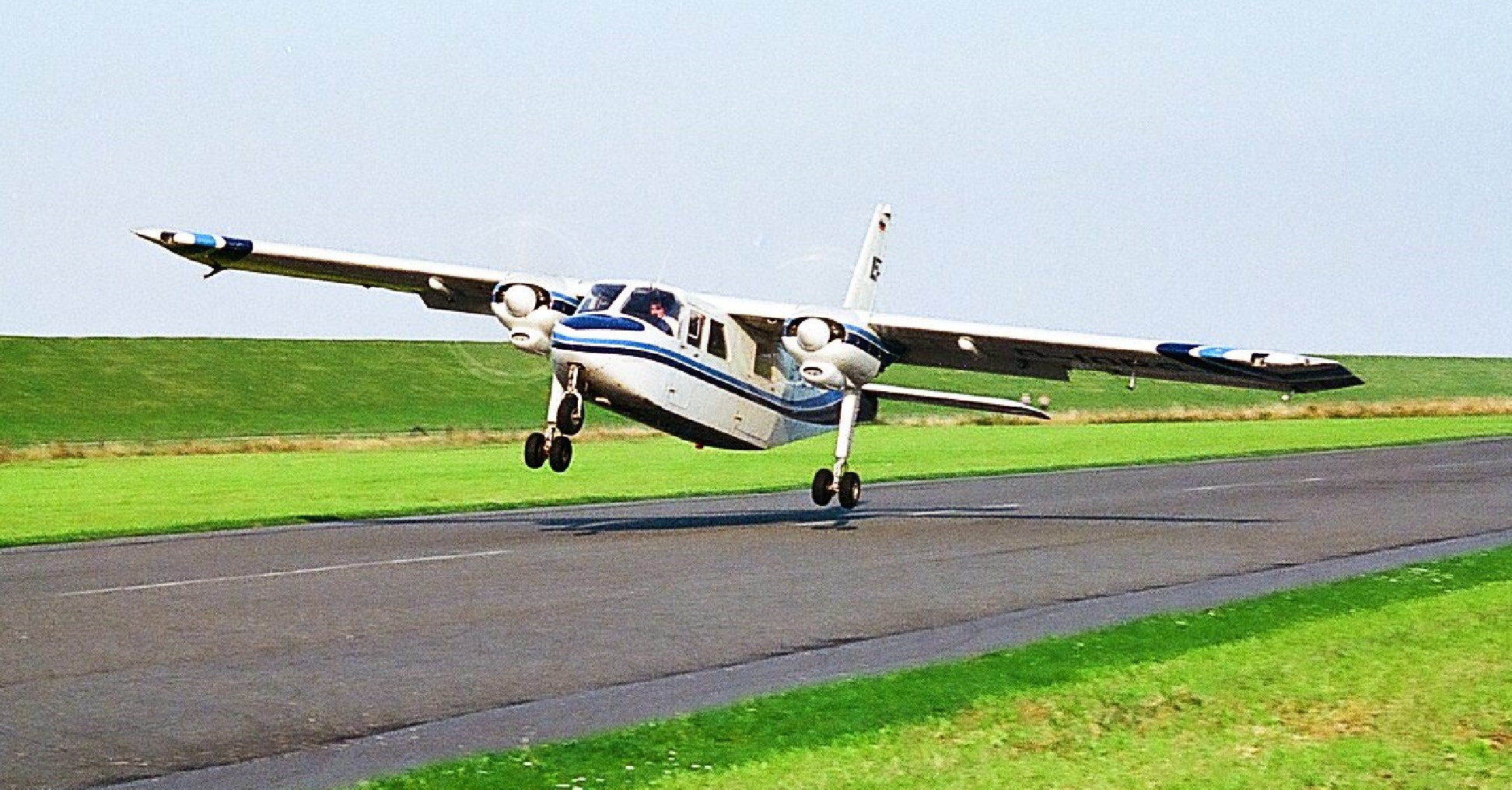
BN-2 Islander performing crosswind landing with left wing down at 30 kn (15 m/s) crosswind

The sideslip crosswind technique is to maintain the aircraft's heading aligned with the runway centerline. The initial phase of the approach is flown using the crab technique to correct for drift. The aircraft heading is adjusted using opposite rudder and ailerons into the wind to align with the runway. This places the aircraft at a constant sideslip angle, which its natural stability will tend to correct. Sufficient rudder and aileron must be applied continuously to maintain the sideslip at this value. The dihedral action of the wings has a tendency to cause the aircraft to roll, so aileron must be applied to check the bank angle.

With a slight residual bank angle, a touchdown is typically accomplished with the upwind main wheels touching down just before the downwind wheels. Excessive control must be avoided because over-banking could cause the engine nacelle or outboard wing flap to contact the runway/ground. In strong crosswind conditions, it is sometimes necessary to combine the crab technique with the sideslip technique.

=== Forward slip ===
A forward slip is used whenever the aircraft is too high on approach, and there needs to be a rapid reduction of altitude without a gain of airspeed in order to conduct a safe landing.

The following techniques are recommended by Airbus for a crosswind landing:

Crabbed Approach

Airplane approaches the runway with airplane's nose into the wind. During flare, the rudder is used to align the nose with the runway centerline and opposite aileron is used to create sideslip to prevent the airplane drifting away from the centerline. This is a mix of crab and sideslip and it is a recommendation from Airbus. Crab angle is removed before the touchdown in order to reduce the side loads on the landing gear of the airplane.

Sideslip Approach

Airplane approaches the runway in steady sideslip, maintains the sideslip during flare and touch down. Sideslip is maintained by lowering the wing into the wind and applying opposite rudder just enough to prevent the heading from changing. The longitudinal axis of the airplane is aligned with the runway centerline. Though, it is a sideslip but airplane actually doesn't slip in the direction of lower wing because of the crosswind pushing the airplane back on the desired track. This technique is not recommended by Airbus because the bank angle required to fly the steady sideslip is large and places the airplane close to the geometry and roll/rudder limits. Excessive bank angle close to the ground may lead to wing/engine scraping the ground.
