= Landing =

Transition from being in flight to being on a surface

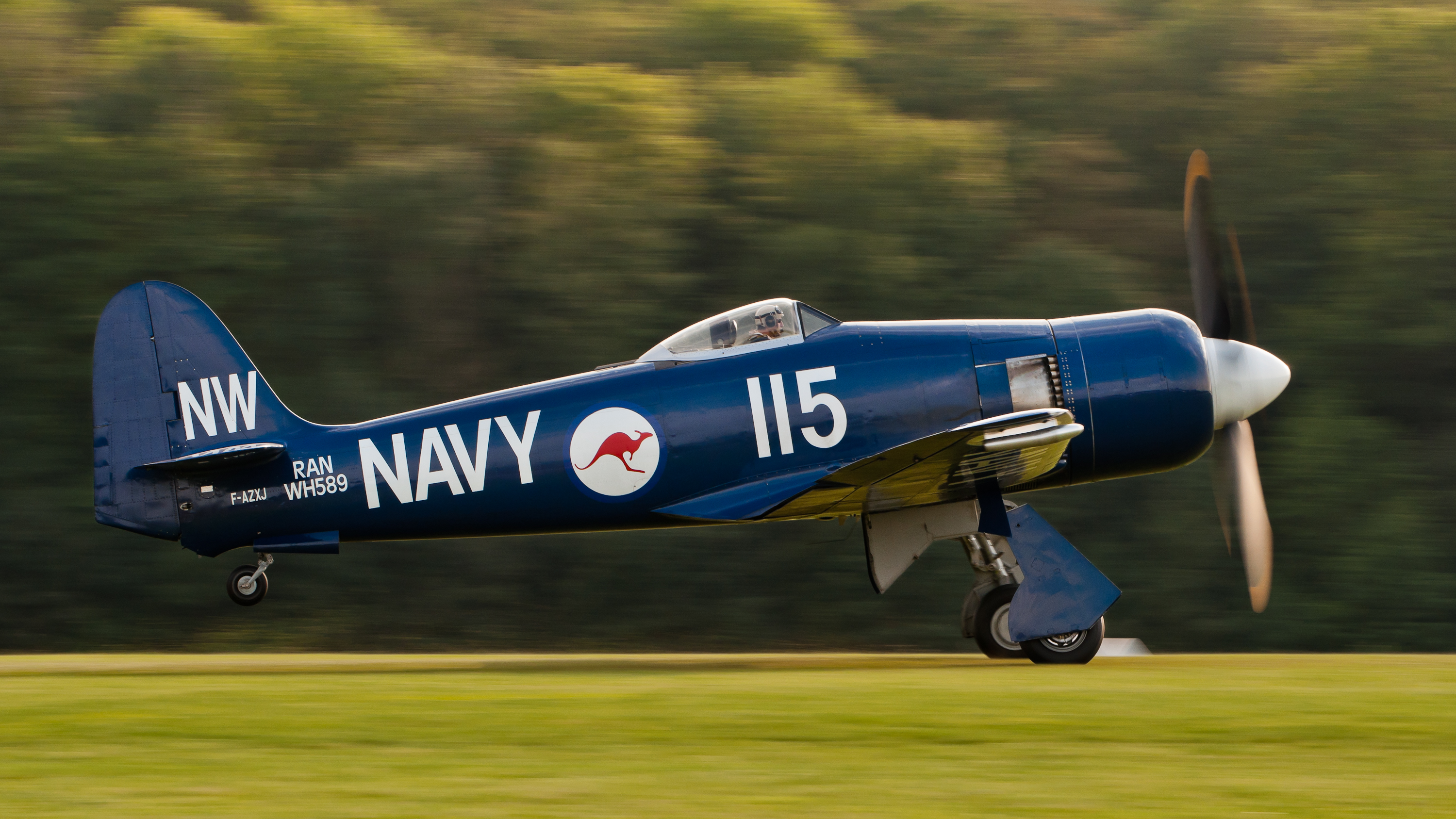
Landing of Hawker Sea Fury FB 10

Landing is the last part of a flight, where a flying animal, aircraft, or spacecraft returns to the ground. When the flying object returns to water, the process is called alighting, although it is commonly called "landing", "touchdown"^{a} or "splashdown" as well. A normal aircraft flight would include several parts of flight including taxi, takeoff, climb, cruise, descent and landing.

An aircraft landing at Haneda Airport in Japan, 2021

== Aircraft ==
Aircraft usually land at an airport on a firm runway or helicopter landing pad, generally constructed of asphalt concrete, concrete, gravel or grass. Aircraft equipped with pontoons (floatplane) or with a boat hull-shaped fuselage (a flying boat) are able to land on water. Aircraft also sometimes use skis to land on snow or ice.

To land, the airspeed and the rate of descent are reduced such that the object descends at a low enough rate to allow for a gentle touch down. Landing is accomplished by slowing down and descending to the runway. This speed reduction is accomplished by reducing thrust and/or inducing a greater amount of drag using flaps, landing gear or speed brakes. When a fixed-wing aircraft approaches the ground, the pilot will move the control column back to execute a flare or round-out. This increases the angle of attack. Progressive movement of the control column back will allow the aircraft to settle onto the runway at minimum speed, landing on its main wheels first in the case of a tricycle gear aircraft or on all three wheels simultaneously in the case of a conventional landing gear-equipped aircraft, commonly referred to as a "taildragger".

=== Light aircraft ===
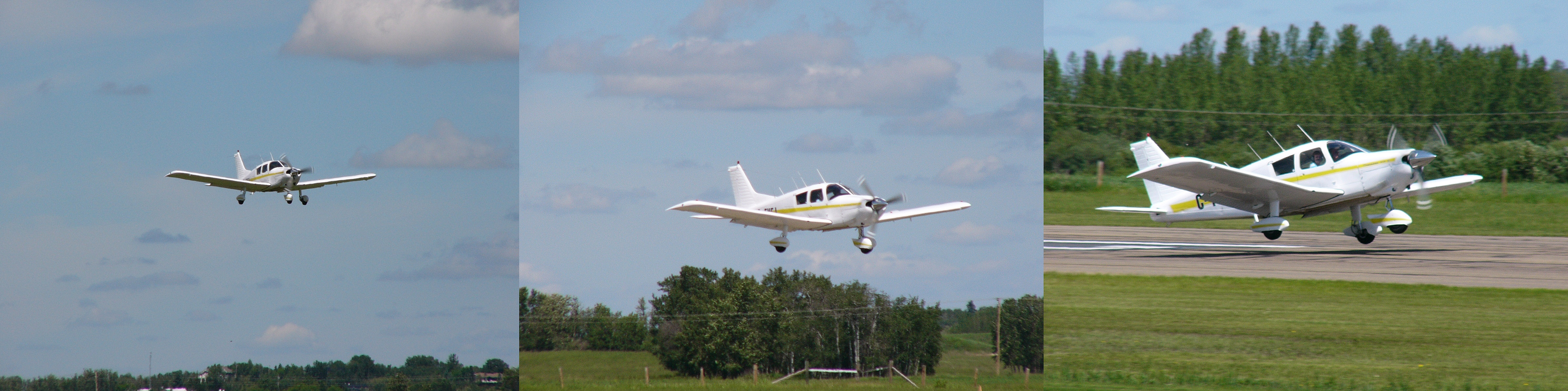
Piper Cherokee landing sequence from approach to flare

In a light aircraft, power is adjusted to control the descent rate, and pitch attitude is adjusted to control airspeed, although theoretically they must be adjusted together.

In a light aircraft, with little crosswind, the ideal landing is when contact with the ground occurs as the forward speed is reduced to the point where there is no longer sufficient airspeed to remain aloft. The stall warning is often heard just before landing, indicating that this speed and altitude have been reached. The result is very light touch down.

Light aircraft landing situations, and the pilot skills required, can be divided into four types:

- Normal landings
- Crosswind landings - where a significant wind not aligned with the landing area is a factor
- Short field landings - where the length of the landing area is a limiting factor
- Soft and unprepared field landings - where the landing area is wet, soft or has ground obstacles such as furrows or ruts to contend with

=== Large aircraft ===
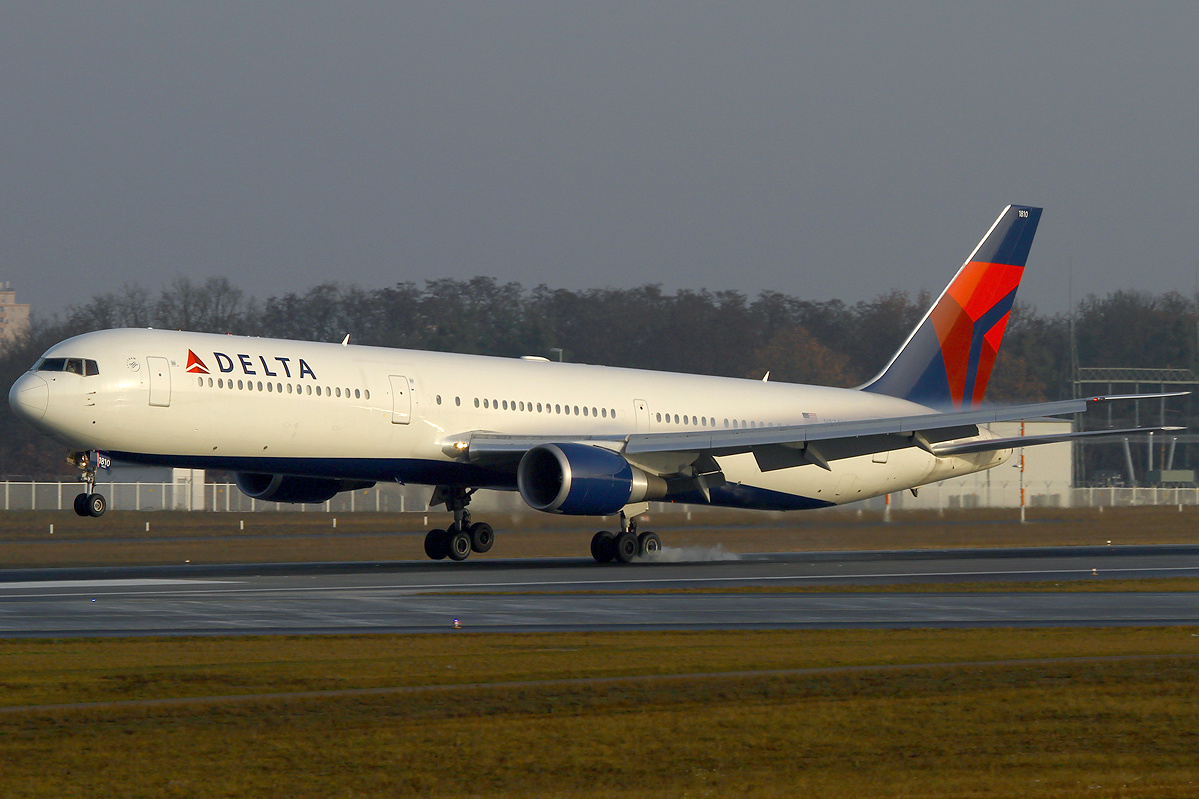
A landing Delta Air Lines Boeing 767-400ER. The smoke emanating from the left main undercarriage wheels shows that it touched down on that main landing gear first, which is normal procedure in a left cross wind.

In large transport category (airliner) aircraft, pilots land the aircraft by "flying the airplane on to the runway." The airspeed and attitude (pitch angle) of the plane are adjusted for landing. Thrust and pitch must be adjusted together, however the technique is reversed compared to light aircraft. In large aircraft, thrust is used to control airspeed and pitch is used to control rate of descent. The airspeed is kept well above stall speed and at a constant rate of descent. A flare is performed just before landing, and the descent rate is significantly reduced, causing a light touch down. Upon touchdown, spoilers (sometimes called "lift dumpers") are deployed to dramatically reduce the lift and transfer the aircraft's weight to its wheels, where mechanical braking, such as an autobrake system, can take effect. Reverse thrust is used by many jet aircraft to help slow down just after touch-down, redirecting engine exhaust forward instead of back. Some propeller-driven airplanes also have this feature, where the blades of the propeller are re-angled to push air forward instead of back using the 'beta range'.

=== Environmental factors ===
Factors such as crosswind where the pilot will use a crab landing or a slip landing will cause pilots to land slightly faster and sometimes with different aircraft attitude to ensure a safe landing.

Other factors affecting a particular landing might include: the plane size, wind, weight, runway length, obstacles, ground effects, weather, runway altitude, air temperature, air pressure, air traffic control, visibility, avionics and the overall situation.

For example, landing a multi-engine turboprop military such as a C-130 Hercules, under fire in a grass field in a war zone, requires different skills and precautions than landing a single engine plane such as a Cessna 150 on a paved runway in uncontrolled airspace, which is different from landing an airliner such as an Airbus A380 at a major airport with air traffic control.

Required Navigation Performance (RNP) is being used more and more. Rather than using radio beacons, the airplane uses GPS-navigation for landing using this technique. This translates into a much more fluid ascent, which results in decreased noise, and decreased fuel consumption.

== Parachutes ==
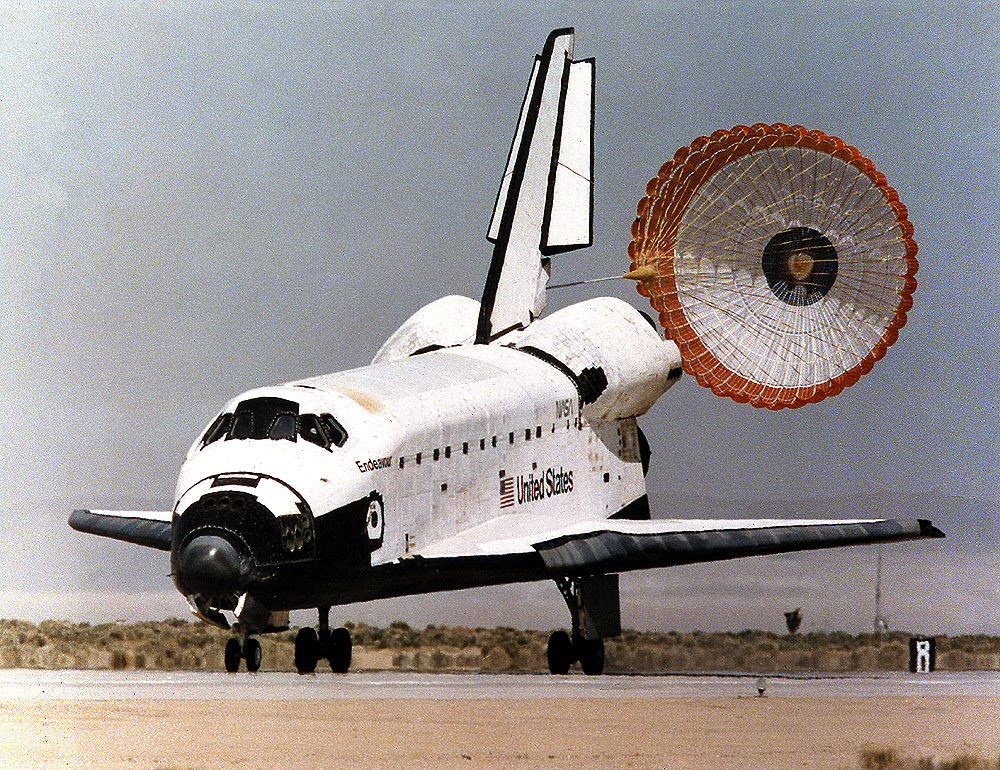
A drag chute is deployed by Space Shuttle Endeavour during landing

The term "landing" is also applied to people or objects descending to the ground using a parachute. Some consider these objects to be in a controlled descent instead of actually flying. Most parachutes work by capturing air, inducing enough drag that the falling object hits the ground at a relatively slow speed. There are many examples of parachutes in nature, including the seeds of a dandelion.

On the other hand, modern ram-air parachutes are essentially inflatable wings that operate in a gliding flight mode. Parachutists execute a flare at landing, reducing or eliminating both downward and forward speed at touchdown, in order to avoid injury.

== Spacecraft ==
Sometimes, a safe landing is accomplished by using multiple forms of lift, thrust (propulsive landing) and dampening systems. Both the Surveyor uncrewed lunar probe craft and the Apollo Lunar Module used a rocket deceleration system and landing gear to soft-land on the Moon. Several Soviet rockets including the Soyuz spacecraft have used parachutes and airbag landing systems to dampen the landing on Earth. In November 2015, Blue Origin's New Shepard became the first rocket to cross the Kármán line (edge of space at 100 km altitude) and land vertically back on Earth. In December 2015, SpaceX's Falcon 9 became the first launch vehicle on an orbital trajectory to successfully vertically-land and recover its first stage, although the landed first stage was on a sub-orbital trajectory.

== See also ==
- Arresting gear
- Landing performance
- Visual approach
- Unstable approach
- Instrument approach
- Instrument landing system (ILS)
- Instrument flight rules (IFR)
- Visual flight rules (VFR)
- Go around

Types of landing

- Soft landing
- Crosswind landing
- Hard landing
- Forced landing, including
  - Precautionary landing
  - Deadstick landing
  - Belly landing
  - Emergency landing
  - Ditching
- Touch-and-go landing

== Notes ==
- ^a touchdown: tango delta, TD
