= Crosswind =

Wind that faces opposite side of a plane when landing

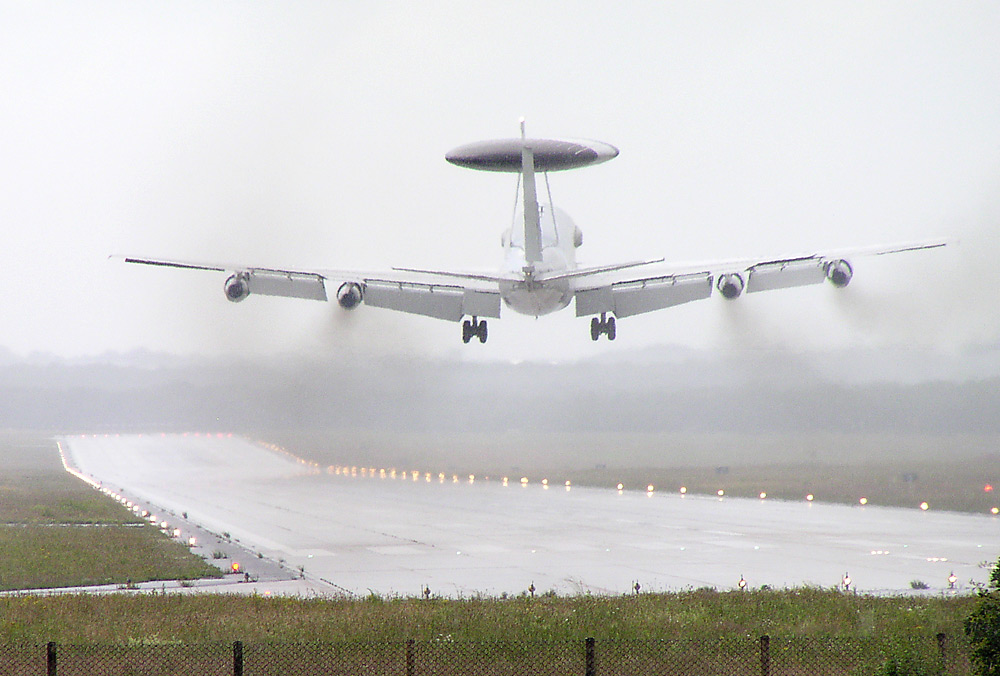
In a crosswind landing, the fuselage of the plane may be skewed relative to the runway

A crosswind is any wind that has a perpendicular component to the line or direction of travel. This affects the aerodynamics of many forms of transport. Moving non-parallel to the wind direction creates a crosswind component on the object and thus increasing the apparent wind on the object; such use of cross wind travel is used to advantage by sailing craft, kiteboarding craft, power kiting, etc. On the other side, crosswind moves the path of vehicles sideways and can be a hazard.

== Definition ==
When winds are not parallel to or directly with/against the line of travel, the wind is said to have a crosswind component; that is, the force can be separated into two vector components:

- the headwind or tailwind component in the direction of motion,
- the crosswind component perpendicular to the former.

A vehicle behaves as though it is directly experiencing a lateral effect of the magnitude of the crosswind component only. The crosswind component is computed by multiplying the wind speed by the sine of the angle between the wind and the direction of travel while the headwind component is computed in the same manner, using cosine instead of sine. For example, a 10 knot wind coming at 45 degrees from either side will have a crosswind component of 10 knots × sin(45°) and a head/tailwind component of 10 knots × cos(45°), both equals to 7.07 knots.

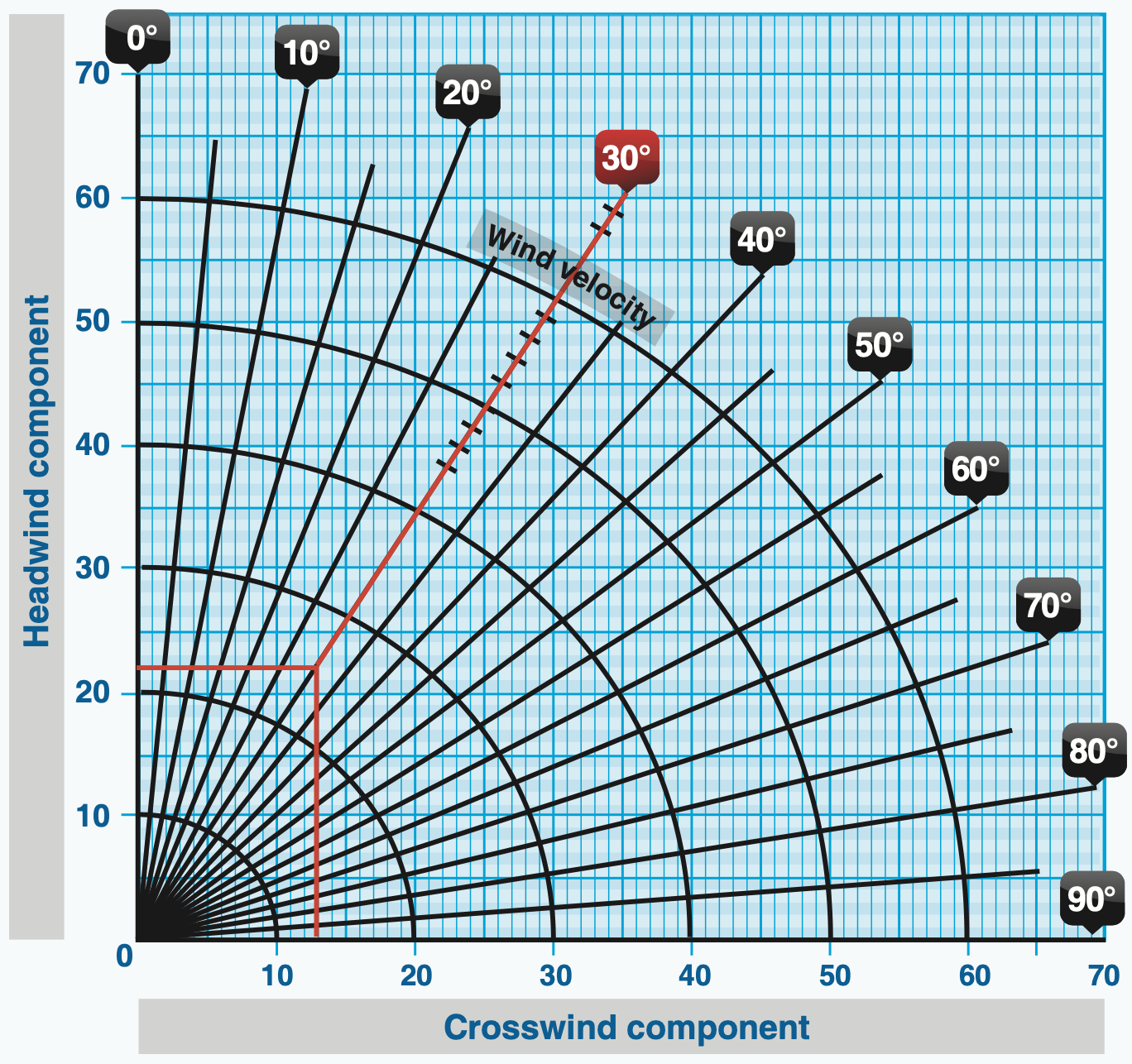
Pilots can use a use a crosswind component chart to calculate the headwind component and the crosswind component. The red line in this image indicates a 30° angular difference at a 25-knot wind velocity. The headwind is about 22 knots, and the crosswind is about 13 knots.

To determine the crosswind component in aviation, aviators frequently refer to a nomograph chart on which the wind speed and angle are plotted, and the crosswind component is read from a reference line. Direction of travel relative to the wind may be left or right, up or down, or oblique.

== Impact ==
Skilled cyclists can ride in crosswinds using a Belgian tourniquet (Belgischer Kreisel)

In aviation, a crosswind is the component of wind that is blowing across the runway, making landings and take-offs more difficult than if the wind were blowing straight down the runway. If a crosswind is strong enough, it can damage an aircraft's undercarriage upon landing. Crosswinds, sometimes abbreviated as X/WIND, are reported in knots, abbreviated kt, and often use the plural form in expressions such as "with 40kt crosswinds". Smaller aircraft are often not limited by their ability to land in a crosswind, but may see their ability to taxi safely reduced.

Crosswinds can also cause difficulty with ground vehicles traveling on wet or slippery roads (snow, ice, standing water, etc.), especially when gusting conditions affect vehicles that have a large side area such as vans, SUVs, and tractor-trailers. This can be dangerous for motorists because of the possible lift force created, causing the vehicle to lose traction or change direction of travel. The safest way for motorists to deal with crosswinds is by reducing their speed to reduce the effect of the lift force and to steer into the direction of the crosswind.

Cyclists are also significantly affected by crosswinds. Saving energy by avoiding riding in wind is a major part of the tactics of road bicycle racing, and this particularly applies in crosswinds. In crosswinds, groups of cyclists form 'echelons', rotating from the windward and leeward side. Riders who fail to form part of an echelon will have to work much harder, and can be dropped by the group that they are with. Crosswinds are common on races near the coast, and are often a feature of the Belgian classic one-day races, or flat stages of the Tour de France.

== See also ==
- Headwind and tailwind – Type of wind by direction of travel
- Air navigation
- E6-B flight computer – Circular slide rule used in aviation
- Tacking (sailing) – Sailing maneuver
- Crosswind stabilization – Advanced driver-assistance system
