= Kabo Air =

Nigerian charter airline

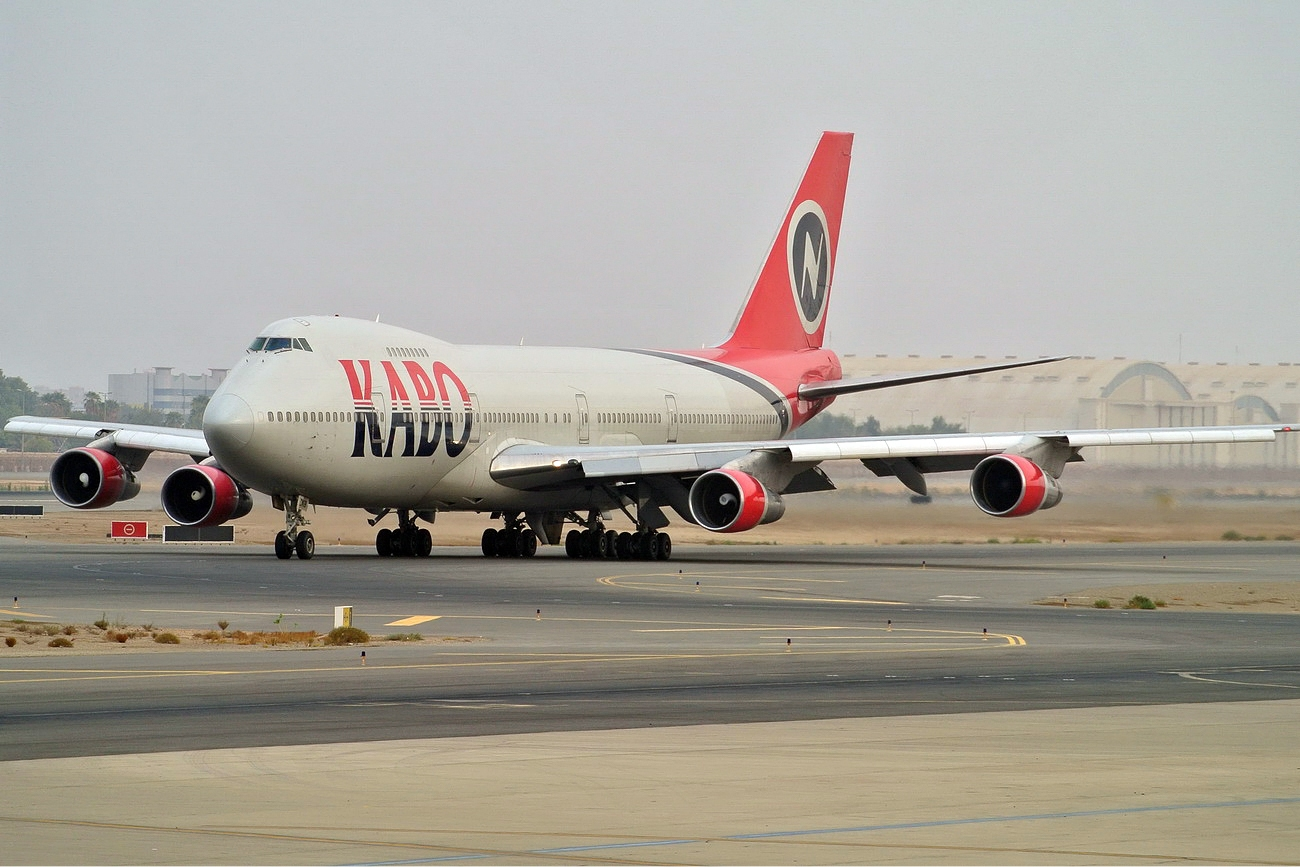
- A Kabo Air 747-200 in 2012
IATA	ICAO	Call sign
N9	QNK	KABOv
- Founded: 1980
- Ceased operations: 2017
- Hubs: Mallam Aminu Kano International Airport
- Parent company: Kabo Holdings
- Headquarters: Kano, Nigeria
- Key people: Saidu Mohammed, Managing director
- Website: www.flykabo.com

Kabo Air was a Nigerian charter airline headquartered in Kano, Kano State and based at Mallam Aminu Kano International Airport.

== History ==
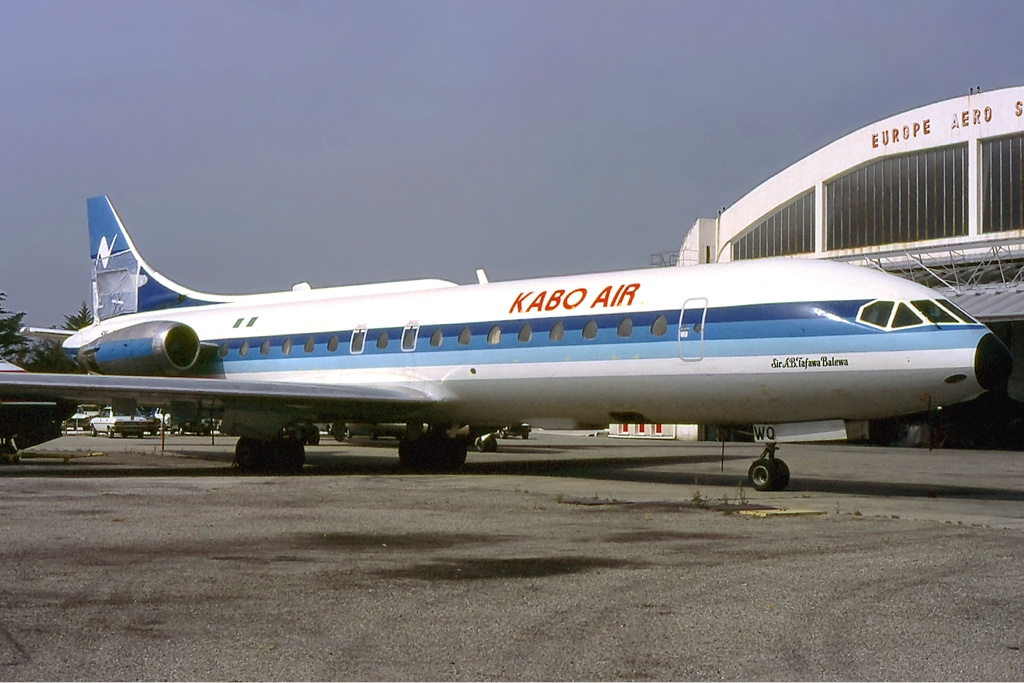
A former Kabo Air Sud Aviation Caravelle in 1985

Kabo Air was established in February 1980 by Dr. Alhaji Muhammadu Adamu Dankabo and started operations in April 1981.

Kabo Air originally operated special charter services for corporate bodies, executives, and government officials. The company stopped operating domestic services in 2001 when they focus solely on Hajj flights and international charters. However, in 2009 the airline received approval to start international scheduled services. Traffic rights were given to Kabo Air for operating scheduled services to Rome, Nairobi and N'Djamena, but have not been used. The airline operated scheduled flights from Kano to Abuja, Cairo, Dubai and Jeddah for a short period.

Kabo Air met the requirements set by the Nigerian Civil Aviation Authority (NCAA) for re-capitalization in May 2007.

On 3 March 2017, the offices of Kabo Air were sealed by the Nigerian Federal Inland Revenue Service due to unpaid tax liabilities. It has been reported that Kabo Air owes over 149 million Nigerian naira (approx. US-$460,000) in taxes.

Later that year, Kabo Air ceased operations permanently after being unable to pay back taxes.

== Destinations ==
As of March 2017, Kabo Air did not operate any scheduled services and focused on charter operations only, especially for pilgrim flights under its own name and on behalf of other airlines.

== Fleet ==
Kabo Air previously operated the following aircraft:

- 3 Boeing 737-200 (1983–1986)
- 11 Boeing 747-100 (1993–2003), including N747PA
- 9 Boeing 747-200s (1982–2015)
- 2 Boeing 747-400 (2015–2017)
- 1 Boeing 757-200 (2009–2010)
- 1 Boeing 767-300ER (2009)
- 2 Douglas DC-8 (1988–1994)

== Incidents and accidents ==
- On 6 August 1986, a Sud Aviation SE-210 Caravelle III overran the runway at Calabar Airport, Nigeria. Passengers and crew survived but the aircraft was written off.
- On 16 September 1991, a BAC 1-11 landed at Port Harcourt Airport, Nigeria without lowering its gear. All passengers and crew survived but the aircraft was written off.
- On March 31 1992, Flight 671, operated by Trans-Air Service as a Kabo Air flight, lost two engines on the right wing in flight. The Boeing 707 made a successful emergency landing at Istres-Le Tubé Air Base and all aboard survived.
- On 23 August 1992, a BAC 1–11 overran the runway at Sokoto Airport, Nigeria. None of the 53 passengers and 4 crew were killed but the aircraft was written off.
- On 12 January 2010, a Middle East Airlines Airbus A330 collided with a parked Kabo Air Boeing 747 while taxiing to its arrival gate at Kano International Airport, Nigeria; none of the passengers or crew were injured. The Boeing 747's left wing and main fuel tank were badly damaged, and the right wing of the Airbus A330 was damaged. Officials believe the accident could have been avoided if there had been more ground lighting to help the pilots of the Airbus A330 to see.
- In September 2013, a Kabo Air Boeing 747-200 operated on a Hajj charter on behalf of Biman Bangladesh Airlines was refused to receive permission to land in Saudi Arabia as the aircraft at age 21 violated the country's guidelines for aircraft to be a maximum 20 years old to be operated into Saudi Arabia. Biman Bangladesh claimed that Kabo Air did give wrong information regarding the plane age.
- On 4 October 2013, a Kabo Air Boeing 747-200 on a Hajj charter flight from Kano via Sokoto to Jeddah was cleared to land on Sokoto's runway 08. However, the aircraft continued to land on the opposite runway 26 for unknown reasons. The aircraft came in too low and hit parts of the ILS before coming to stop with some burst tyres. The Nigerian aviation authorities rated this incident as serious and started investigations on why the crew chose the wrong runway.
