= Emirates Flight 407 =

2009 aviation accident in Melbourne, Australia

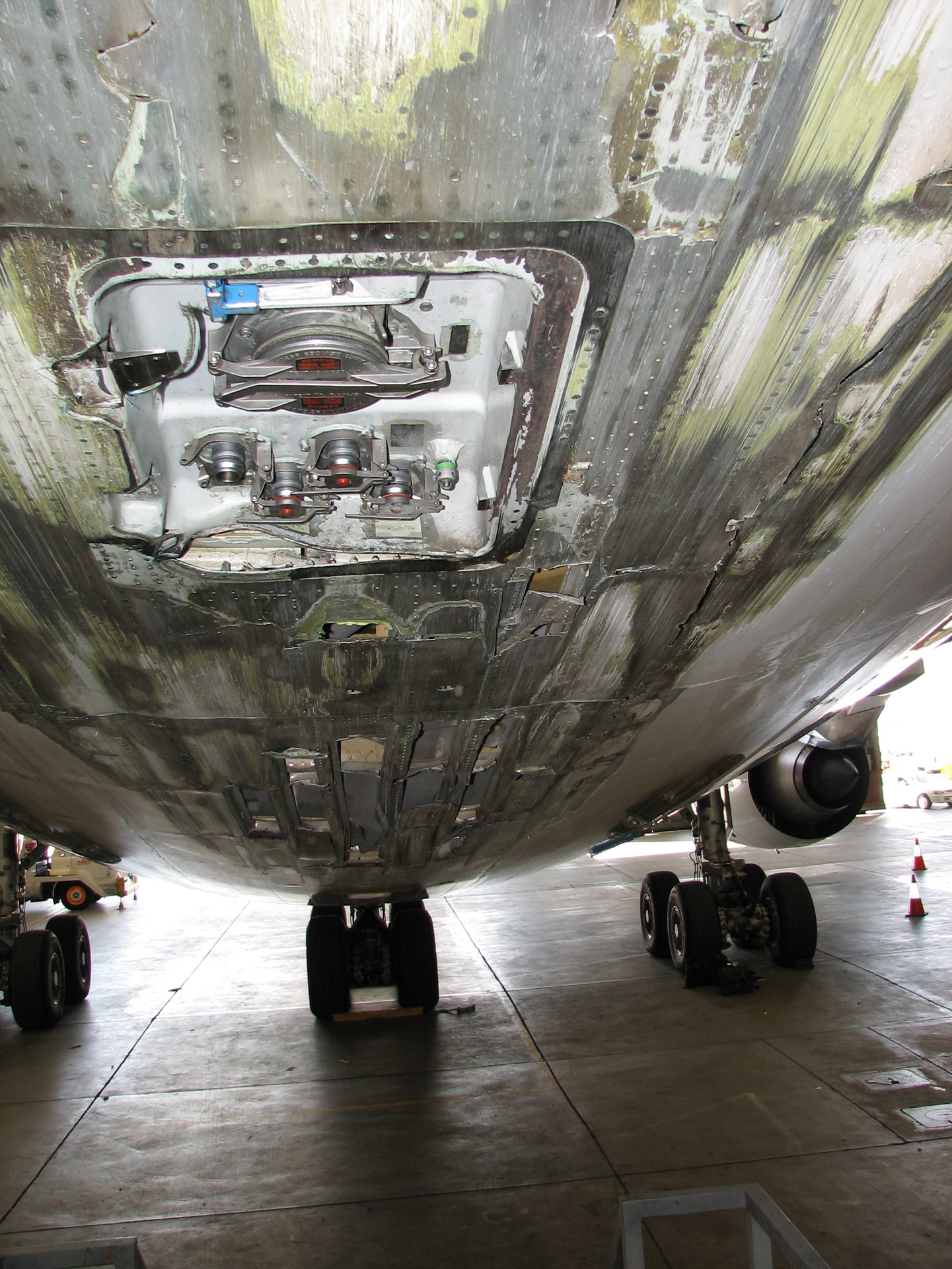
- The damage done to the tail

Accident
- Date: 20 March 2009
- Summary: Tailstrike on takeoff and runway overrun due to pilot error
- Site: Melbourne Airport, Melbourne, Australia; 37°40′14″S 144°50′17″E

Aircraft
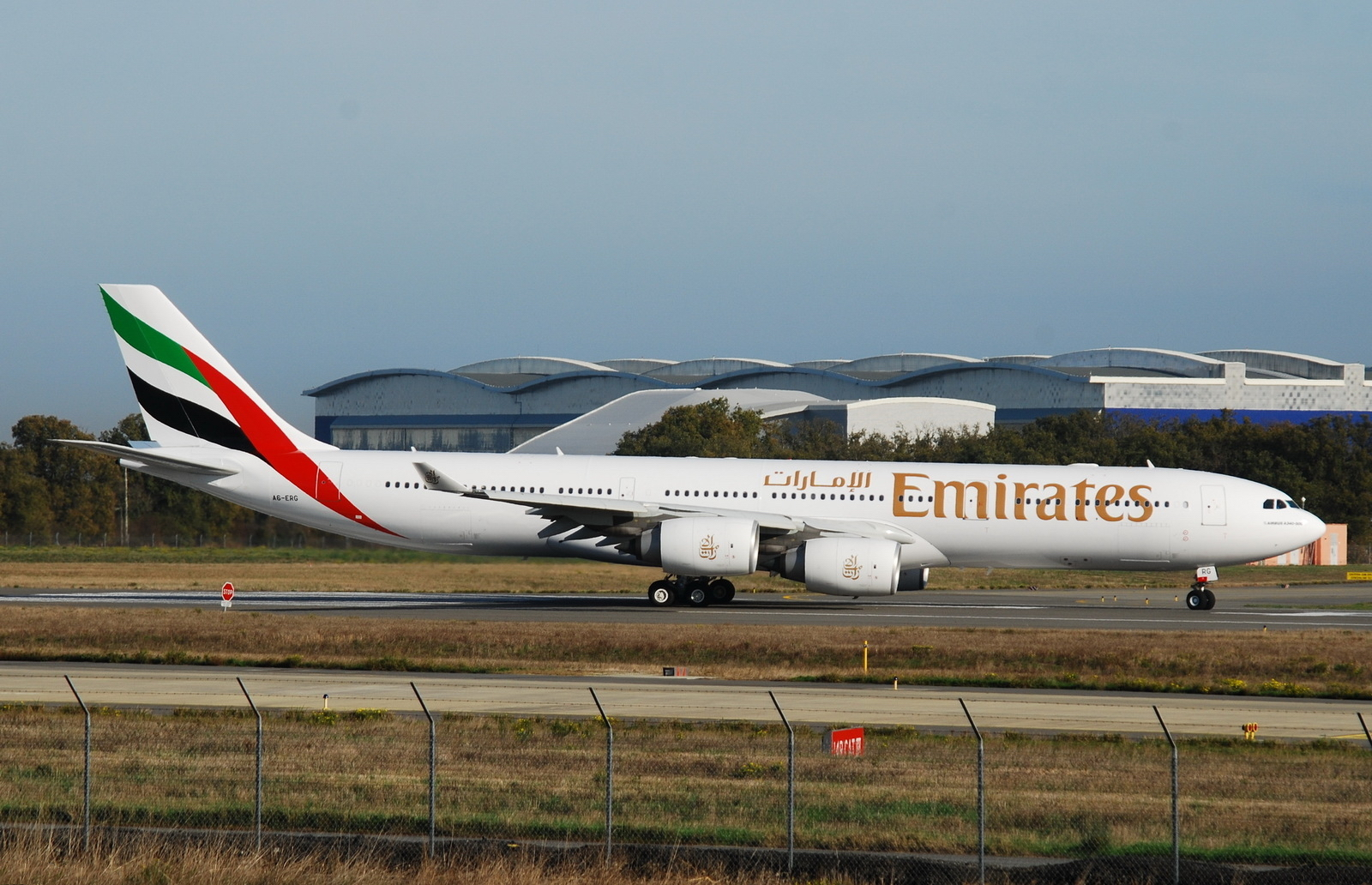
- A6-ERG, the aircraft involved, seen 9 months later in December 2009
- Aircraft type: Airbus A340-541
- Operator: Emirates
- IATA flight No.: EK407
- ICAO flight No.: UAE407
- Call sign: EMIRATES 407
- Registration: A6-ERG
- Flight origin: Auckland Airport, Auckland, New Zealand
- Stopover: Melbourne Airport Melbourne, Australia
- Destination: Dubai International Airport, Dubai, United Arab Emirates
- Occupants: 275
- Passengers: 257
- Crew: 18
- Fatalities: 0
- Survivors: 275

Emirates Flight 407 was a scheduled international passenger flight operated by Emirates from Auckland to Dubai with a stopover in Melbourne, operated by an Airbus A340 aircraft. On 20 March 2009, the aircraft failed to take off properly at Melbourne Airport, hitting several structures at the end of the runway before climbing and then returning to the airport for a safe landing. Although no fatalities or injuries resulted, damage to the aircraft was severe enough for the event to be classified by Australian Transport Safety Bureau as an "accident". It was subsequently determined that a data-entry error resulted in insufficient engine thrust during take off. It has been described "as close as we have ever come to a major aviation catastrophe in Australia" by aviation officials.

== Chronology ==
The scheduled flight departed from Melbourne as planned at 22:30 using runway 16, which was 3,657 metres (11,998 feet) long. The captain ordered the first officer to rotate 1,043 metres (3,422 ft) before the end of the runway, travelling at a speed of 270 km/h (146 kn; 168 mph). As the aircraft pitched upward, it failed to leave the ground and the tail section struck and continued to scrape along the runway. The captain took over the controls and applied maximum thrust on all four engines by using the takeoff/go-around detent. After exhausting the entire length of the runway, the aircraft failed to become airborne, and did not leave the ground until 148 m (486 ft) beyond the end of the runway. The captain later said, "I thought we were going to die. It was that close".

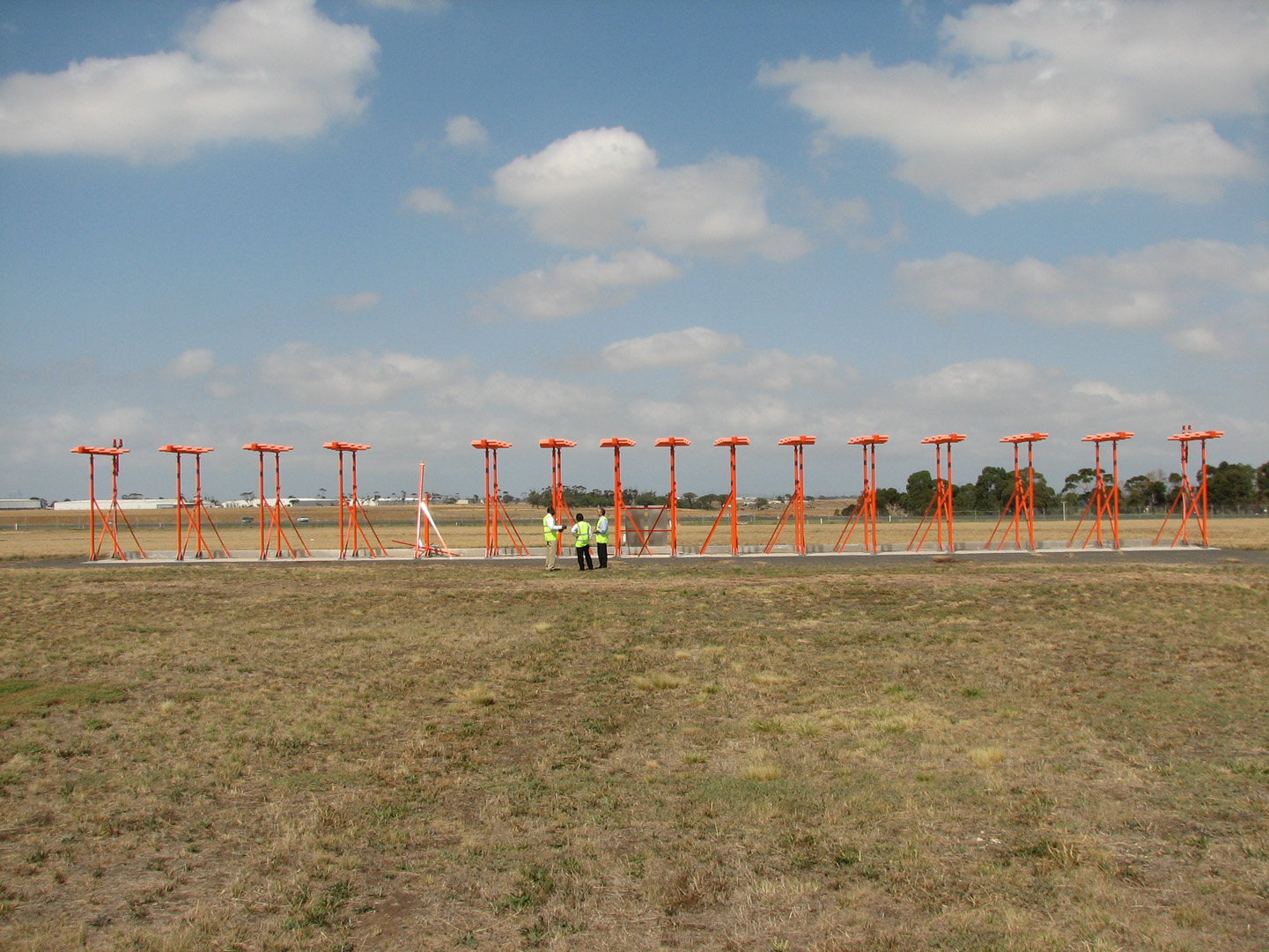
Damage to the ILS localiser when A6-ERG overran the runway

Subsequently, the aircraft hit a strobe light at the end of the runway and continued to climb with difficulty. At 350 metres (1,148 ft) beyond the end of the runway, the landing gear hit and damaged the 1.8-metre-high (5 ft 11 in) localiser antenna array. At 500 metres (1,640 ft) beyond the end of the runway, the aircraft barely missed the 2.24-metre-tall (7 ft 4 in) airport perimeter fence.

The aircraft eventually climbed away over Port Phillip Bay. The first officer then reviewed the takeoff performance calculations in his electronic flight bag, and discovered that he had understated the aircraft's weight by 100 tonnes (262.9 tonnes instead of 362.9). This meant that an incorrect flex temp was applied, which had resulted in a lower than necessary engine thrust and consequently insufficient acceleration and airspeed.

The pilots finished dumping fuel over the bay by 23:27, and they subsequently received a report of smoke in the cabin. They requested an immediate return, which air traffic control granted, and they returned to the airport at 23:36 without further incident.

== Aircraft damage and repair ==
Despite having tailstrike protection built into the A340-500, the rear pressure bulkhead and the underlying structure were severely damaged during the take-off roll when the tail struck the runway with considerable force. The aircraft also suffered extensive damage to the bottom of the fuselage as it scraped along the runway, a large surface having been completely stripped off its external sheet.

The aircraft was not written off, but was instead returned to Airbus by way of a low-altitude flight without pressurisation routed from Melbourne to Toulouse on 19 June via Perth, Singapore, Dubai, and Cairo with the crew flying below 12,000 feet (3,700 m).

The aircraft was an A340-500 registered A6-ERG. It was delivered to Emirates on November 30, 2004. The aircraft made its first revenue flight after repairs on 1 December 2009 as flight EK424, and remained in service operating short- to medium-haul international flights out of Dubai, until it was withdrawn from service in October 2014. It was stored at Tarbes–Lourdes–Pyrénées Airport.

== Aircrew ==
After being interviewed by investigators, the two pilots of the flight returned to Dubai. The captain and the first officer were asked to resign from Emirates upon their arrival in Dubai, and both did so.

The captain of Flight 407 had slept for only 6 hours during the 24 hours before the accident, while the first officer had 8 hours of sleep in the same period. (Note: The Sunday Herald Sun reported that one of the pilots had slept only three and a half hours) The captain had flown a total 99 hours during the prior month, 1 hour short of the maximum 100 flying hours allowed by Emirates, while the first officer had flown 90 hours in the same period.

== Investigation ==
The Australian Transport Safety Bureau (ATSB) performed the accident investigation. Central to the investigation was how the first officer had come to use the wrong aircraft weight, why that mistake was not picked up before takeoff, and why the flight crew had not realized the acceleration was much slower than expected until nearly entirely exhausting the 3.6-kilometre (12,000-foot) runway.

Studies showed that aircrew could have difficulty recognising that incorrect data had been entered in avionic equipment, resulting in poor take-off performance. The ATSB issued a safety recommendation to the United States Federal Aviation Administration and a safety advisory notice to the International Air Transport Association and the Flight Safety Foundation. In addition, Airbus investigated the development of software to help pilots recognise unusual or poor performance on take-off.

In October 2011, the ATSB released their findings. They found that human error was the cause, and urged the development of technological aids that would alert pilots to incorrect data entry or insufficient take-off speed.

In response to the incident, Emirates reviewed its preflight procedures, mandating the duplication of laptop computers used for preflight planning so as to ensure dual data entry. They are also developing an avionics system for take-off acceleration-monitoring and alerting. Airbus updated its software to detect erroneous data. In October 2011, they announced plans to include a software program to calculate the required runway length. Furthermore, Airbus is developing a monitoring system to compute required acceleration rates and apply a "reasonableness test" to data input and alert the pilot to any potential errors.

== In popular culture ==
The events of the incident are documented in a season 2 episode of the TV series Aircrash Confidential, titled "Take-off".

== See also ==
- MK Airlines Flight 1602
- Comair Flight 5191
- Pan Am Flight 845
