= Boeing 747 =

American wide-body four-engined jet long-range aircraft

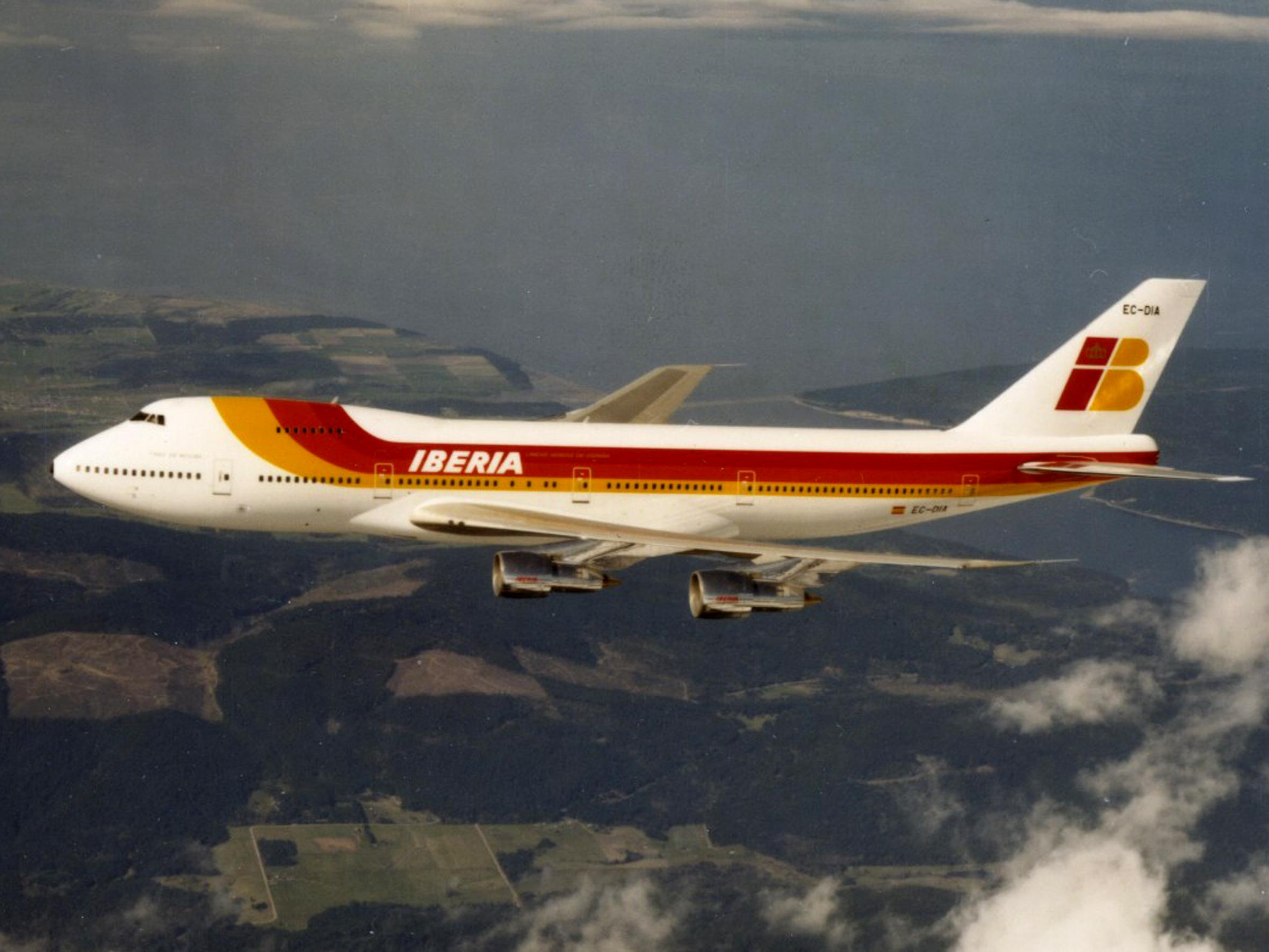
- A Boeing 747-200 operated by Iberia

General information
- Type: Wide-body jet airliner
- National origin: United States
- Manufacturer: Boeing Commercial Airplanes
- Status: In cargo service; in limited passenger service
- Primary users: Pan Am (historical): Atlas Air; UPS Airlines; Lufthansa
- Number built: 1,574 (inc N7470 prototype)

History
- Manufactured: 1968–2023
- Introduction date: January 22, 1970, with Pan Am
- First flight: February 9, 1969 (57 years ago)
- Variants: Boeing 747-400; Boeing 747-8; Boeing 747SP; Stratospheric Observatory for Infrared Astronomy (SOFIA); Boeing E-4; SNC E-4C; Boeing VC-25; Boeing VC-25B Bridge
- Developed into: Boeing 747 Supertanker; Boeing Dreamlifter; Boeing YAL-1; Shuttle Carrier Aircraft

The Boeing 747 is a long-range wide-body airliner designed and manufactured by Boeing Commercial Airplanes in the United States between 1968 and 2023. It was conceived in response to the demand of Pan Am for a jet 2 1/2 times the size of the 707, which had been introduced in October 1958, to reduce the airline's seat cost by 30%. The design team was led by Joe Sutter, who left the 737 development program in 1965 to design the 747. In April 1966, Pan Am ordered 25 Boeing 747-100 aircraft, and in late 1966, Pratt & Whitney agreed to develop the JT9D engine, a high-bypass turbofan. On September 30, 1968, the first 747 was rolled out of the purpose-built Everett Plant, the world's largest building by volume. The 747's first flight took place on February 9, 1969, and the 747 was certified in December 1969. It entered service with Pan Am on January 22, 1970. The 747 was the first airplane called a "Jumbo Jet" as the first wide-body airliner.

The 747 is a four-engined jet aircraft, initially powered by Pratt & Whitney JT9D turbofan engines, then General Electric CF6 and Rolls-Royce RB211 engines for the original variants. With a ten-abreast economy seating, it typically accommodates 366 passengers in three travel classes. It has a pronounced 37.5° wing sweep, allowing a Mach 0.85 (490 kn; 900 km/h) cruise speed, and its heavy weight is supported by four main landing gear legs, each with a four-wheel bogie. The partial double-deck aircraft was designed with a raised cockpit so it could be converted to a freighter airplane by installing a front cargo door; it was initially thought that the passenger version would eventually be superseded by supersonic transports.

Boeing introduced the 747-200 in 1971, with uprated engines for a heavier maximum takeoff weight (MTOW) of 833,000 pounds (378 t) from the initial 735,000 pounds (333 t), increasing the maximum range from 4,620 to 6,560 nautical miles [nmi] (8,560 to 12,150 km; 5,320 to 7,550 mi). It was shortened for the longer-range 747SP in 1976, and the 747-300 followed in 1983 with a stretched upper deck for up to 400 seats in three classes. The heavier 747-400 with improved RB211 and CF6 engines or the new PW4000 engine (the JT9D successor), and a two-crew glass cockpit, was introduced in 1989 and is the most common variant. After several studies, the stretched 747-8 was launched on November 14, 2005, using the General Electric GEnx engine first developed for the 787 Dreamliner (the inspiration for the -8 in the name), and was first delivered in October 2011. The 747 is the basis for several government and military variants, such as the VC-25 (Air Force One), E-4 Emergency Airborne Command Post, Shuttle Carrier Aircraft, and some experimental test aircraft such as the YAL-1 and Stratospheric Observatory for Infrared Astronomy (SOFIA) airborne observatory.

Initial competition came from the smaller trijet widebodies: the Lockheed L-1011 (introduced in 1972), McDonnell Douglas DC-10 (1971) and later MD-11 (1990). Airbus competed with later variants with the heaviest versions of the A340 until surpassing the 747 in size with the A380, delivered between 2007 and 2021. These later variants of the 747 also faced internal competition from, and were ultimately superseded by, larger variants of the Boeing 777, such as the 777-300ER and 777-9. Freighter variants of the 747 remain popular with cargo airlines. The final 747 was delivered to Atlas Air in January 2023 after a 54-year production run, with 1,574 aircraft built. As of October 2025, 65 Boeing 747s (4.1%) have been lost in accidents and incidents, in which a total of 3,746 people have died.

== Development ==
=== Background ===
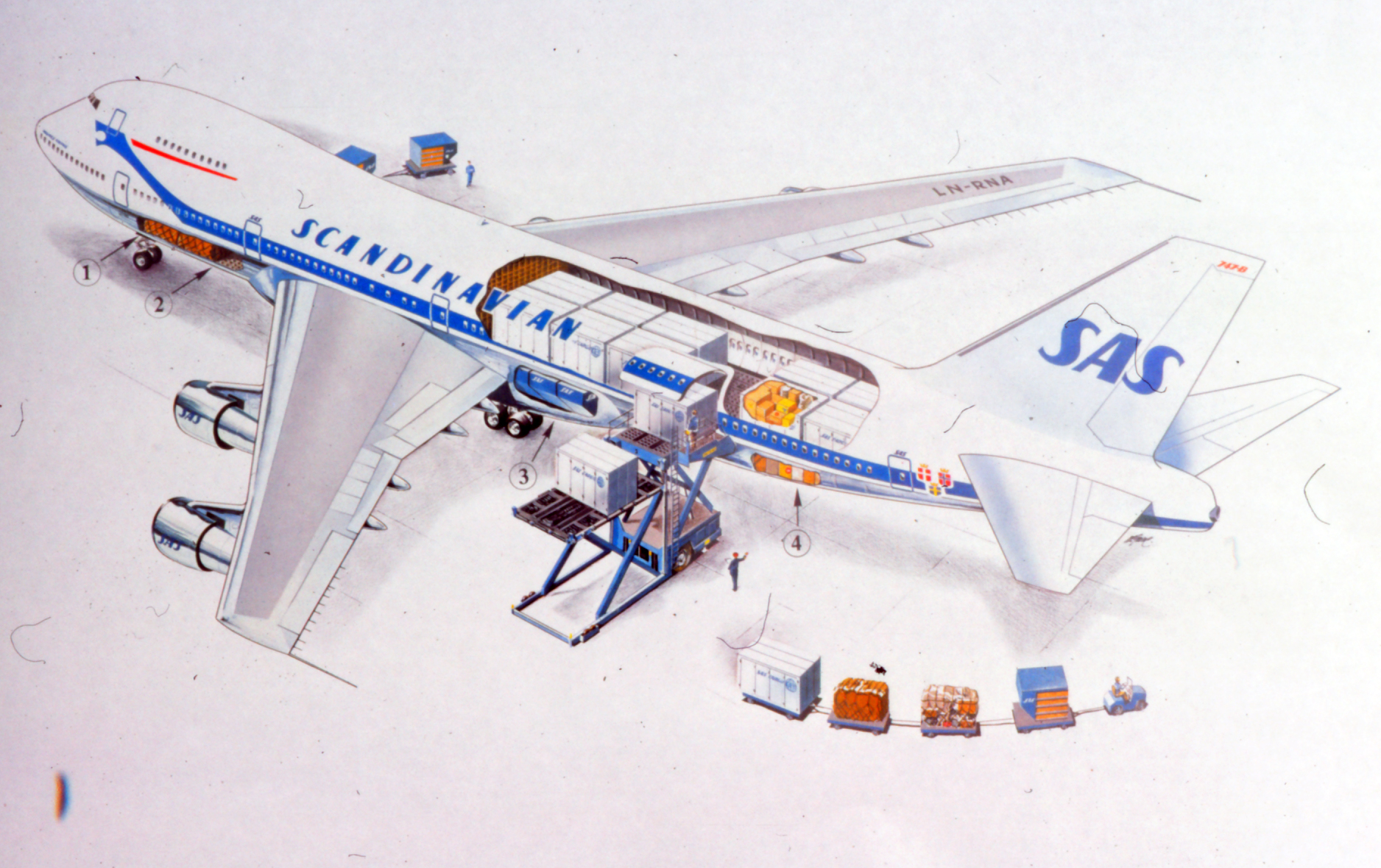
Cutaway drawing of a Scandinavian Airlines 747-200M Combi showcasing the 747's freight carrying capabilities

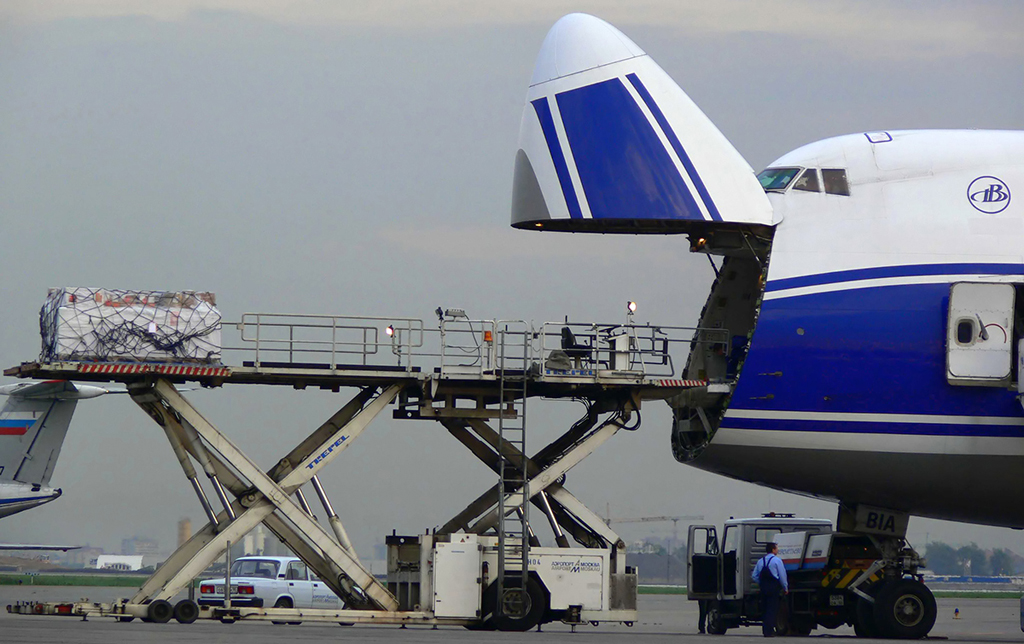
Cargo nose door open with cargo loader

In 1963, the United States Air Force (USAF) began a series of study projects on an extremely large strategic transport aircraft. Although the C-141 Starlifter was being introduced, officials believed that a much larger and more capable aircraft was needed, especially to carry cargo that would not fit in any existing aircraft. These studies led to initial requirements for the CX-Heavy Logistics System (CX-HLS) in March 1964 for an aircraft with a load capacity of 180,000 pounds (81.6 t) and a speed of Mach 0.75 (430 kn; 800 km/h), and an unrefueled range of 5,000 nautical miles (9,300 km; 5,800 mi) with a payload of 115,000 pounds (52.2 t). The payload bay had to be 17 feet (5.18 m) wide by 13.5 feet (4.11 m) high and 100 feet (30 m) long with access through doors at the front and rear.

The desire to keep the number of engines to four required new engine designs with greatly increased power and better fuel economy. In May 1964, airframe proposals arrived from Boeing, Douglas, General Dynamics, Lockheed, and Martin Marietta; engine proposals were submitted by General Electric, Curtiss-Wright, and Pratt & Whitney. Boeing, Douglas, and Lockheed were given additional study contracts for the airframe, along with General Electric and Pratt & Whitney for the engines.

The airframe proposals shared several features. As the CX-HLS needed to be able to be loaded from the front, a door had to be included where the cockpit usually was. All of the companies solved this problem by moving the cockpit above the cargo area; Douglas had a small "pod" just forward and above the wing, Lockheed used a long "spine" running the length of the aircraft with the wing spar passing through it, while Boeing blended the two, with a longer pod that ran from just behind the nose to just behind the wing. In 1965, Lockheed's aircraft design and General Electric's engine design were selected for the new C-5 Galaxy transport, which was the largest military aircraft in the world at the time. Boeing carried the nose door and raised cockpit concepts over to the design of the 747.

=== Proposal ===
The 747 was conceived while air travel was increasing in the 1960s. The era of commercial jet transportation, led by the enormous popularity of the Boeing 707 and Douglas DC-8, had revolutionized long-distance travel. In this growing jet age, Juan Trippe, president of Pan American Airways (Pan Am), one of Boeing's most important airline customers, asked for a new jet airliner 2 1/2 times the size of the 707, with a 30% lower cost per unit of passenger-distance and the capability to offer mass air travel on international routes. Trippe also thought that airport congestion could be addressed by a larger aircraft.

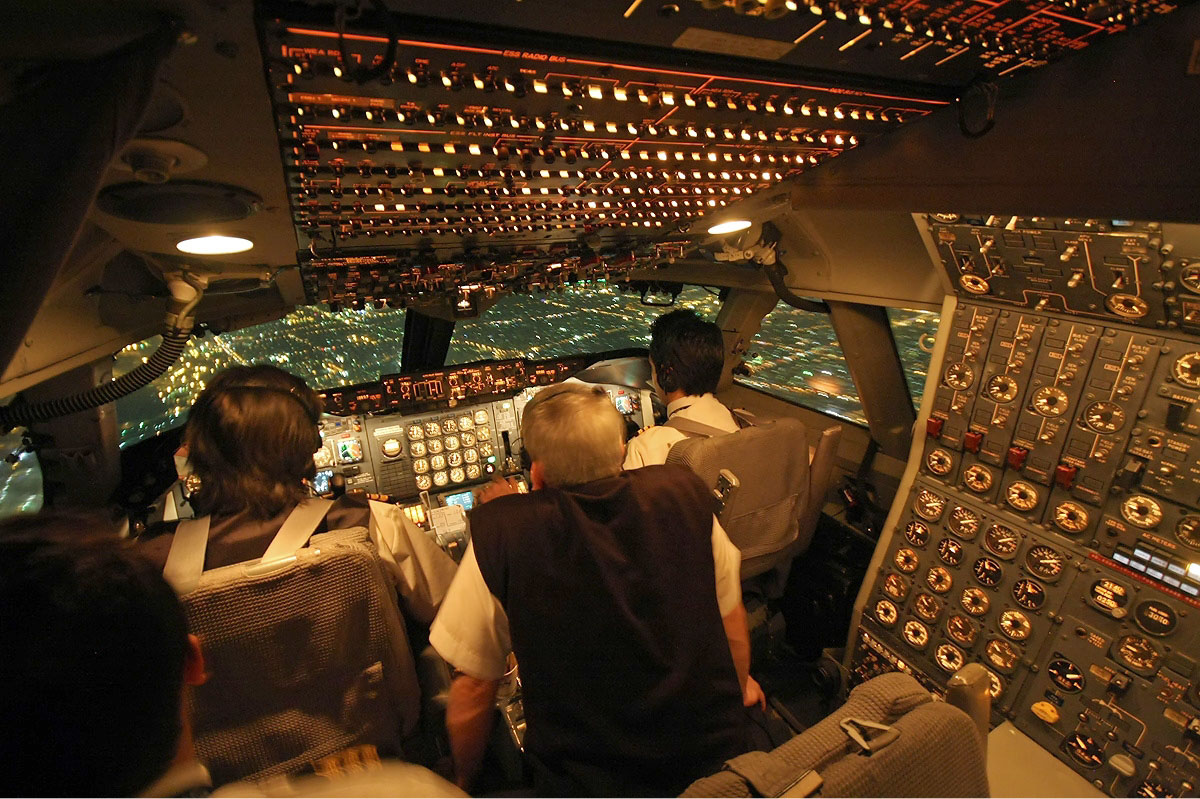
An Iran Air 747-200, showing an early-production 747 cockpit with a flight engineer, located on the upper deck

In 1965, Joe Sutter was transferred from Boeing's 737 development team to manage the design studies for the new airliner, already assigned the model number 747. Sutter began a study with Pan Am and other airlines to better understand their requirements. At the time, many thought that long-range subsonic airliners would eventually be superseded by supersonic transport aircraft. Boeing responded by designing the 747 so it could be easily adapted to carry freight and remain in production even if sales of the passenger version declined.

In April 1966, Pan Am ordered 25 Boeing 747-100 aircraft for US$525 million (equivalent to $4.0 billion in 2025 dollars). During the ceremonial 747 contract-signing banquet in Seattle on Boeing's 50th Anniversary, Juan Trippe predicted that the 747 would be "…a great weapon for peace, competing with intercontinental missiles for mankind's destiny". As launch customer, and because of its early involvement before placing a formal order, Pan Am was able to influence the design and development of the 747 to an extent unmatched by a single airline before or since. Once additional orders for the aircraft were filed by Japan Airlines and Lufthansa, approval for production of the 747 was given in July 1966.

=== Initial design ===
Ultimately, the high-winged CX-HLS Boeing design was not used for the 747, although technologies developed for their bid had an influence. The original design included a full-length double-deck fuselage with eight-across seating and two aisles on the lower deck and seven-across seating and two aisles on the upper deck. However, concern over evacuation routes and limited cargo-carrying capability caused this idea to be scrapped in early 1966 in favor of a wider single deck design. The cockpit was therefore placed on a shortened upper deck so that a freight-loading door could be included in the nose cone; this feature produced the 747's distinctive "hump". In early models, what to do with the small space in the pod behind the cockpit was not clear, and it was initially specified as a "lounge" area with no permanent seating. (A different configuration that had been considered to keep the flight deck out of the way for freight loading had the pilots below the passengers, and was dubbed the "anteater".)

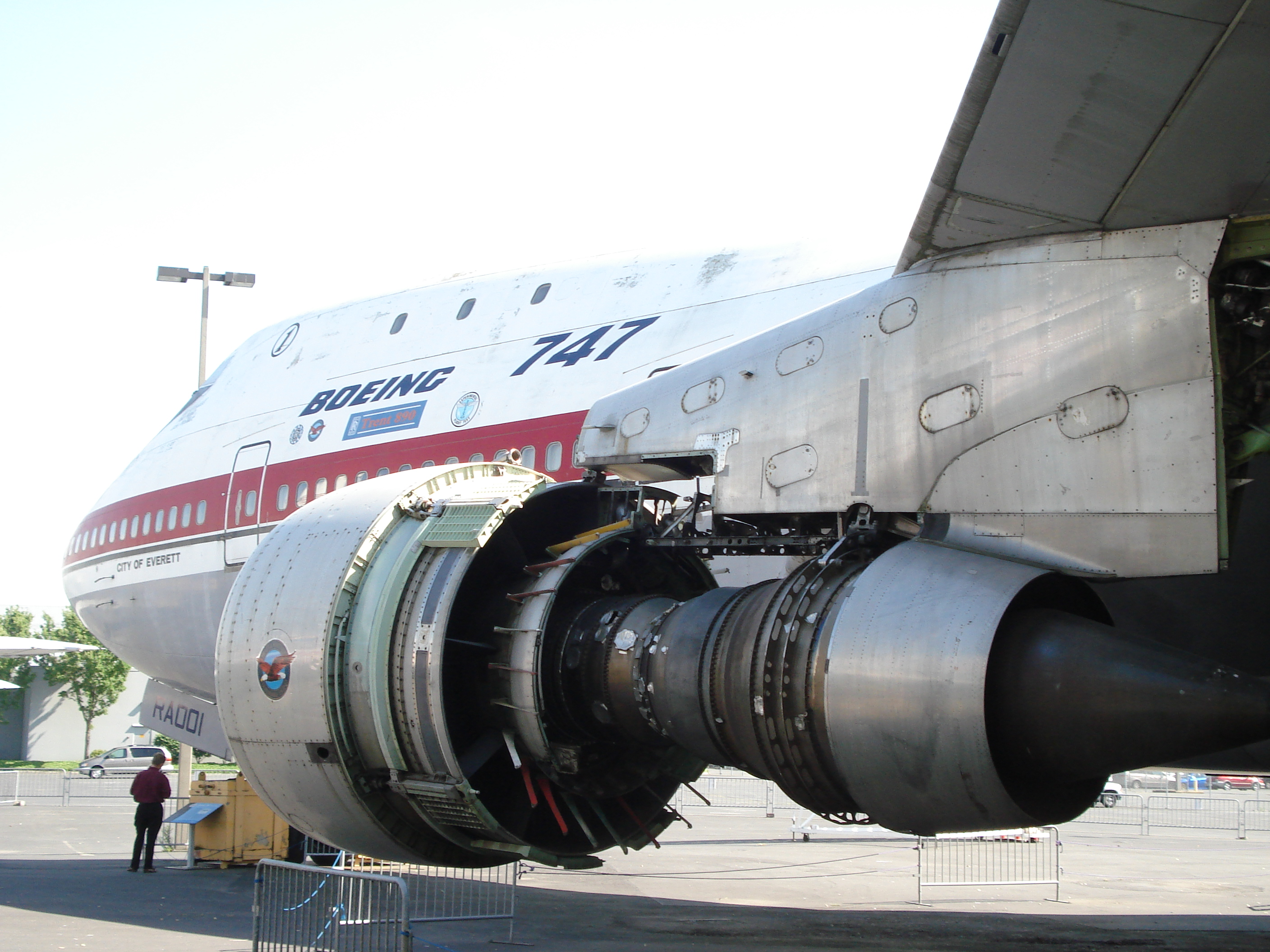
The Pratt & Whitney JT9D high-bypass turbofan engine was developed for the 747.

One of the principal technologies that enabled an aircraft as large as the 747 was the high-bypass turbofan engine. This engine technology was thought to be capable of delivering twice the power of the earlier turbojets while consuming one-third less fuel. General Electric had pioneered the concept but was committed to developing the engine for the C-5 Galaxy and did not enter the commercial market until later. Pratt & Whitney was also working on the same principle and, by late 1966, Boeing, Pan Am and Pratt & Whitney agreed to develop a new engine, designated the JT9D to power the 747.

The project was designed with a new methodology called fault tree analysis, which allowed the effects of a failure of a single part to be studied to determine its impact on other systems. To address concerns about safety and flyability, the 747's design included structural redundancy, redundant hydraulic systems, quadruple main landing gear and dual control surfaces. Additionally, some of the most advanced high-lift devices used in the industry were included in the new design, to allow it to operate from existing airports. These included Krueger flaps running almost the entire length of the wing's leading edge, as well as complex three-part slotted flaps along the trailing edge of the wing. The wing's complex three-part flaps increased wing area by 21% and lift by 90% when fully deployed compared to their non-deployed configuration.

Boeing agreed to deliver the first 747 to Pan Am by the end of 1969. That date left 28 months to design the aircraft, just two-thirds of the normal time. The schedule was so fast-paced that the people who worked on it were given the nickname "The Incredibles". Developing the aircraft was such a technical and financial challenge that management was said to have "bet the company" when it started the project. Due to its large size, Boeing subcontracted the assembly of subcomponents to other manufacturers, notably Northrop and Grumman (later merged into Northrop Grumman in 1994) for fuselage parts and trailing edge flaps respectively, Fairchild for tailplane ailerons, and Ling-Temco-Vought (LTV) for the empennage. For the 747SP, assembly was subcontracted to Japanese companies comprising Mitsubishi, Kawasaki, and Fuji, which were responsible for assembly of the inboard flaps, outboard flaps, and vertical rudder respectively.

=== Assembly plant ===
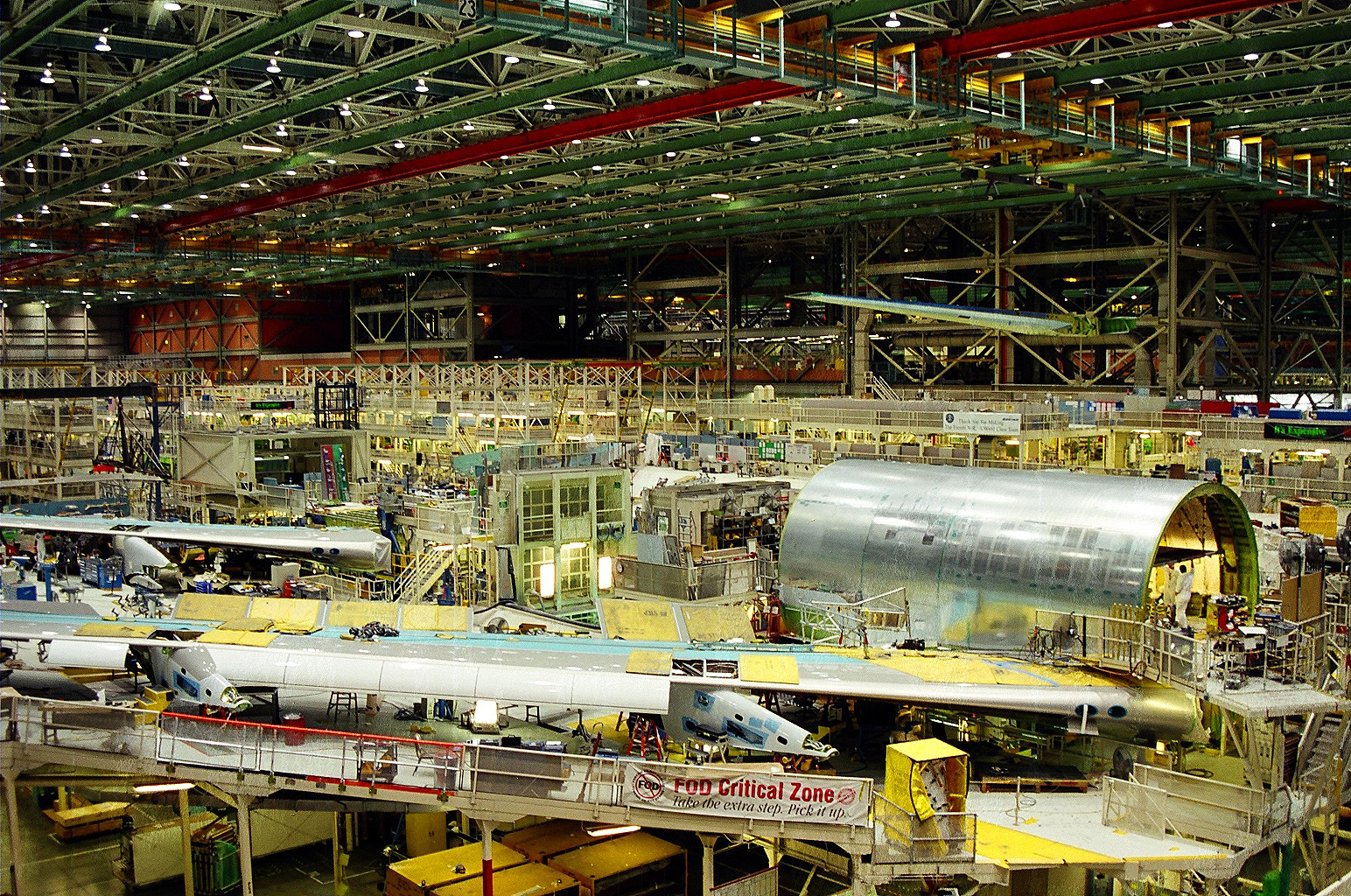
747 final assembly at the Boeing Everett Factory

Boeing did not have a plant large enough to assemble the giant airliner, so they chose to build a new plant. The company considered locations in about 50 cities, and eventually decided to build the new plant some 30 miles (50 km) north of Seattle on a site adjoining a military base at Paine Field near Everett, Washington. It bought the 780-acre (320 ha) site in June 1966.

Developing the 747 had been a major challenge, and building its assembly plant was also a huge undertaking. Boeing president William M. Allen asked Malcolm T. Stamper, then head of the company's turbine division, to oversee construction of the Everett factory and to start production of the 747. To level the site, more than four million cubic yards (three million cubic meters) of earth had to be moved. Time was so short that the 747's full-scale mock-up was built before the factory roof above it was finished. The plant is the largest building by volume ever built, and has been expanded several times to permit construction of other models of Boeing wide-body commercial jets.

=== Flight testing ===
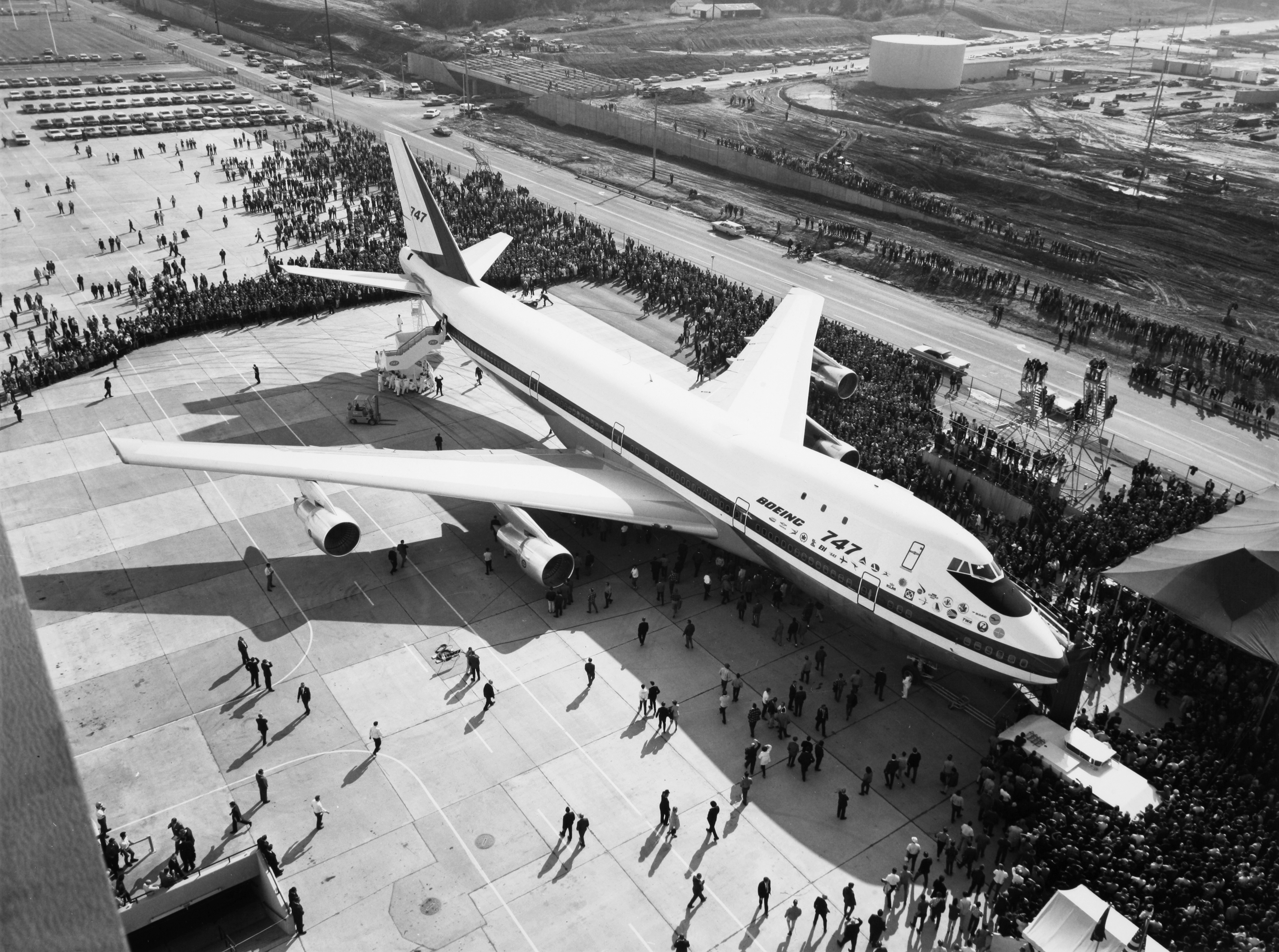
The prototype 747 was first displayed to the public on September 30, 1968.

Before the first 747 was fully assembled, testing began on many components and systems. One important test involved the evacuation of 560 volunteers from a cabin mock-up via the aircraft's emergency chutes. The first full-scale evacuation took two and a half minutes instead of the maximum of 90 seconds mandated by the Federal Aviation Administration (FAA), and several volunteers were injured. Subsequent test evacuations achieved the 90-second goal but caused more injuries. Most problematic was evacuation from the aircraft's upper deck; instead of using a conventional slide, volunteer passengers escaped by using a harness attached to a reel. Tests also involved taxiing such a large aircraft. Boeing built an unusual training device known as "Waddell's Wagon" (named for a 747 test pilot, Jack Waddell) that consisted of a mock-up cockpit mounted on the roof of a truck. While the first 747s were still being built, the device allowed pilots to practice taxi maneuvers from a high upper-deck position.

In 1968, the program cost was US$1 billion (equivalent to $7.1 billion in 2025 dollars). On September 30, 1968, the first 747 was rolled out of the Everett assembly building for the world's press and representatives of the 26 airlines that had ordered the airliner. Over the following months, preparations were made for the first flight, which took place on February 9, 1969, with test pilots Jack Waddell and Brien Wygle at the controls and Jess Wallick at the flight engineer's station. Despite a minor problem with one of the flaps, the flight confirmed that the 747 handled extremely well. The 747 was found to be largely immune to "Dutch roll", a phenomenon that had been a major hazard to the early swept-wing jets.

After the 747's introduction into commercial service in 1970, Boeing continued flight tests to address issues with the 747's design. In its first year of service, it was observed generating a significant amount of wake turbulence and posed a risk for smaller aircraft flying behind it, prompting the FAA to implement separation rules for aircraft flying close to 747s; the French government banned Pan Am from flying 747s into Paris during its first year of 747 service due to this concern. Boeing addressed these concerns in 1970 by conducting wake turbulence tests with a 737-100 flying closely behind a 747 at various distances to measure the wake generation of the larger aircraft, which Boeing found only to have a slight difference from the wake generated by the smaller 707 flown in the same test.

=== Delays and certification ===
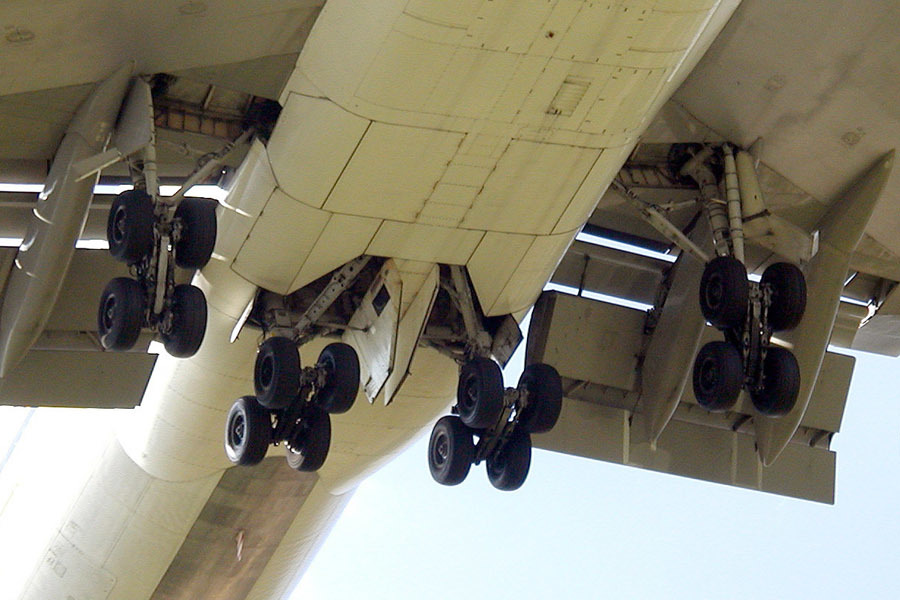
The 747's 16-wheel main landing gear

During later stages of the flight test program, flutter testing showed that the wings suffered oscillation under certain conditions. This difficulty was partly solved by reducing the stiffness of some wing components. However, a particularly severe high-speed flutter problem was solved only by inserting depleted uranium counterweights as ballast in the outboard engine nacelles of the early 747s. This measure caused some concern when these aircraft crashed, for example El Al Flight 1862 at Amsterdam in 1992 with 622 pounds (282 kg) of uranium in the tailplane (horizontal stabilizer); detailed investigations showed, however, that the best estimate of the exposure to depleted uranium was ".. several orders of magnitude less than the workers' limit for chronic exposure."

The flight test program was hampered by problems with the 747's JT9D engines. Difficulties included engine stalls caused by rapid throttle movements and distortion of the turbine casings after a short period of service. The problems delayed 747 deliveries for several months; up to 20 aircraft at the Everett plant were stranded while awaiting engine installation. The program was further delayed when one of the five test aircraft suffered serious damage during a landing attempt at Renton Municipal Airport, the site of Boeing's Renton factory. The incident happened on December 13, 1969, when a test aircraft was flown to Renton to have test equipment removed and a cabin installed. Pilot Ralph C. Cokely undershot the airport's short runway and the 747's right, outer landing gear was torn off and two engine nacelles were damaged. However, these difficulties did not prevent Boeing from taking a test aircraft to the 28th Paris Air Show in mid-1969, where it was displayed to the public for the first time. Finally, in December 1969, the 747 received its FAA airworthiness certificate, clearing it for introduction into service. Pan Am introduced the first 747 service the following year on January 22, 1970.

The huge cost of developing the 747 and building the Everett factory meant that Boeing had to borrow heavily from a banking syndicate. During the final months before delivery of the first aircraft, the company had to repeatedly request additional funding to complete the project. Had this been refused, Boeing's survival would have been threatened. The firm's debt exceeded $2 billion, with $1.2 billion owed to the banks setting a record for all companies. Allen later said, "It was really too large a project for us." Ultimately, the gamble succeeded, and Boeing held a monopoly in very large passenger aircraft production for many years.

=== Improved versions ===
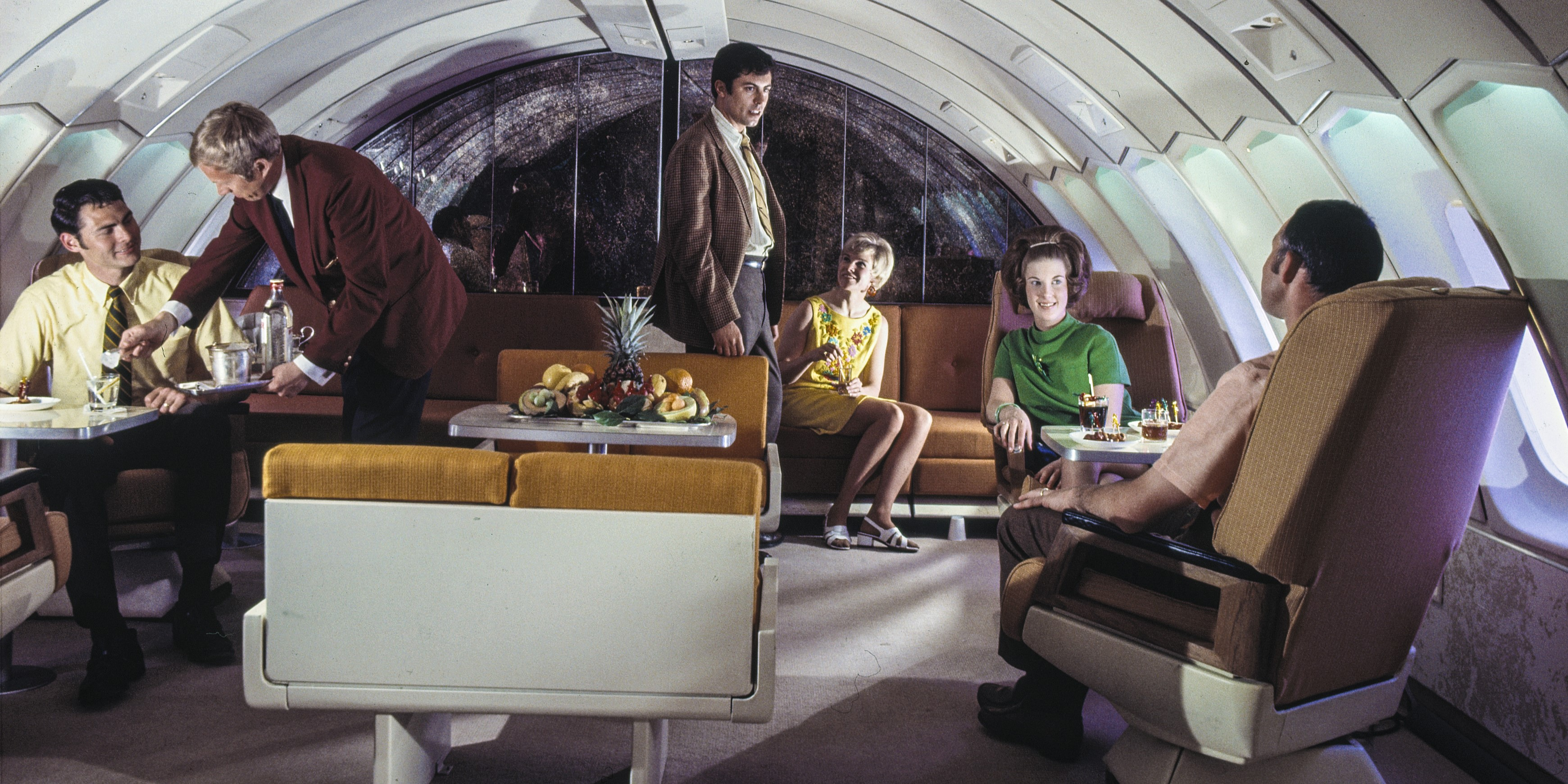
Upper deck lounge configuration on an early 747

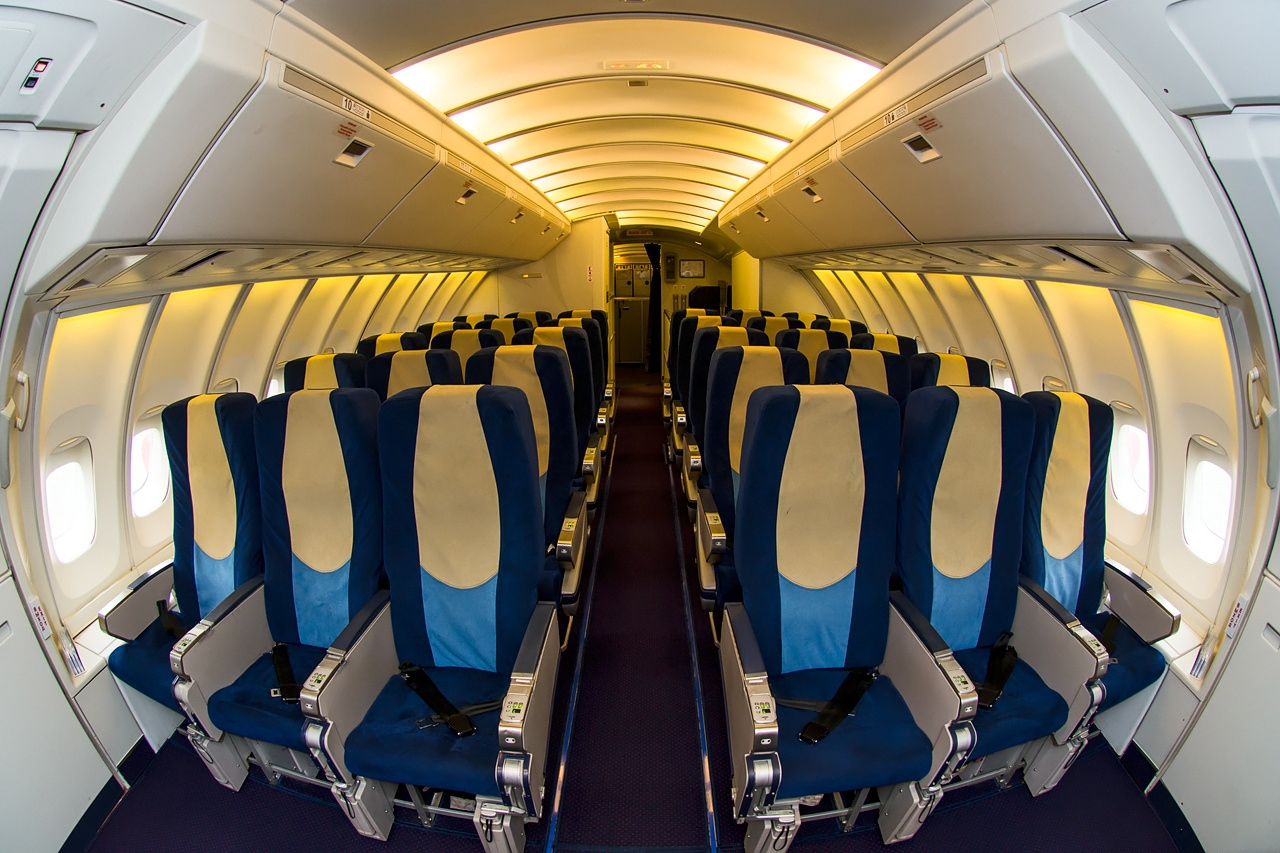
Stretched upper deck cabin of later 747s with six-abreast seating

After the initial 747-100, Boeing developed the -100B, a higher maximum takeoff weight (MTOW) variant, and the -100SR (Short Range), with higher passenger capacity. Increased maximum takeoff weight allows aircraft to carry more fuel and have longer range. The -200 model followed in 1971, featuring more powerful engines and a higher MTOW. Passenger, freighter and combination passenger-freighter versions of the -200 were produced. The shortened 747SP (special performance) with a longer range was also developed, and entered service in 1976.

Boeing primarily focused on improving payload capabilities during the development and testing of the 747-200 and its subvariants in the 1970s. Weight trials were conducted between October and November of 1970 at Edwards Air Force Base with the prototype 747-200B, which reached a maximum takeoff weight of 820,700 pounds (372.3 t) during a test flight on November 12. At that time, the aircraft held the record for the heaviest takeoff weight until heavier and more powerful 747-200 airframes were built. On November 1, 1976, the first RB211-powered 747-200 set a world record for maximum mass lifted during a trial flight at NAS Lemoore, where it flew up to 6,562 feet (2,000 meters) with a weight of 840,500 pounds (381.2 t).

The 747 line was further developed with the launch of the 747-300 on June 11, 1980, followed by interest from Swissair a month later and the go-ahead for the project. The 300 series resulted from Boeing studies to increase the seating capacity of the 747, during which modifications such as fuselage plugs and extending the upper deck over the entire length of the fuselage were rejected. The first 747-300, completed in 1983, included a stretched upper deck, increased cruise speed, and increased seating capacity. The -300 variant was previously designated 747SUD for stretched upper deck, then 747-200 SUD, followed by 747EUD, before the 747-300 designation was used. Passenger, short range and combination freighter-passenger versions of the 300 series were produced.

Throughout the early 1980s, Boeing faced criticism from customers who expressed frustration over Boeing's incremental approach to the 747's development, pointing out that previous 747 variants were developed merely as derivatives of the original 747-100 from the late 1960s, with improvements focused on one area of the design (i.e. payload for the 747-200, range for the 747SP and later 747-200 models, passenger capacity for the 747-300), rather than as major redesigns that incorporated newer technologies of the decade to update systems and performance; in an effort to save on Boeing's total development costs across all aircraft types, the finance department disallowed the design team from proposing major changes to the 747. The demand for a modernized 747 with newer technologies intensified after the publication of an interview with Lufthansa's then-deputy chairman, Reinhardt Abraham, on the May 28, 1984, issue of Aviation Week & Space Technology, which stated:

Boeing is working on all of the proposed improvements but Lufthansa is concerned that they will make them available in a piecemeal fashion. Abraham said this would increase the development cost, which will be passed along to the airlines, and result in airlines operating a fleet of 747 aircraft that have little remaining commonality. "We don't like the piecemeal approach," Abraham said. "We want one full package on the airplane. It would be a big incentive for new orders."

After the publication of Abraham's Aviation Week & Space Technology interview, more airlines became vocal about expressing their demands for a modernized 747, to which Boeing responded by launching the development of the longer-range 747-400 in October 1985. This variant had a new glass cockpit, which allowed for a cockpit crew of two instead of three, new engines, lighter construction materials, a redesigned interior, increased fuel capacity, and aerodynamic improvements (i.e. longer wingspan and added winglets), which enabled the -400 to fly farther and faster than its predecessors. Development costs soared, and production delays occurred as new technologies were incorporated at the request of airlines. Insufficient workforce experience and reliance on overtime contributed to early production problems on the 747-400. The -400 entered service in 1989.

The 747 remained the heaviest commercial aircraft in regular service until the debut of the Antonov An-124 Ruslan in 1982; variants of the 747-400 surpassed the An-124's weight in 2000. The Antonov An-225 Mriya cargo transport, which debuted in 1988, remains the world's largest aircraft by several measures (including the most accepted measures of maximum takeoff weight and length); one aircraft has been completed and was in service until 2022 when it was destroyed. The Scaled Composites Stratolaunch is currently the largest aircraft by wingspan.

=== Further development ===
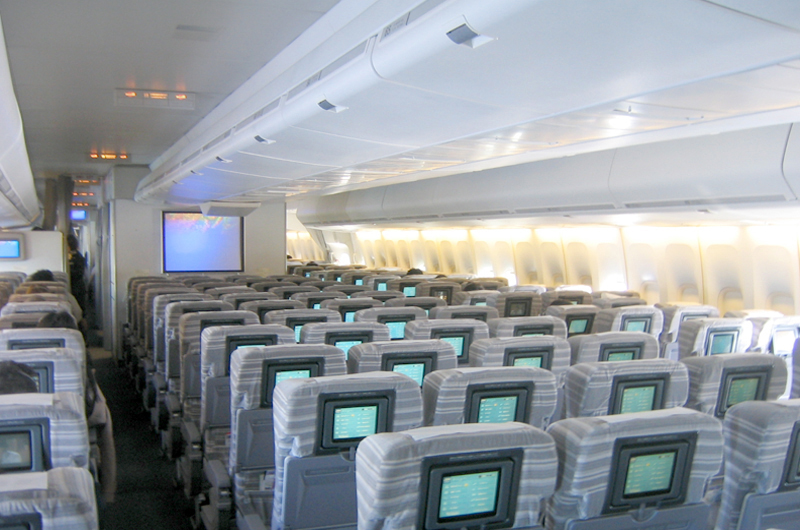
747-400 main deck economy class seating in 3–4–3 layout

After the arrival of the 747-400, several stretching schemes for the 747 were proposed. Boeing announced the larger 747-500X and -600X preliminary designs in 1996. The new variants would have cost more than US$5 billion, and interest was not sufficient to continue. In 2000, Boeing offered the more modest 747X and 747X stretch derivatives as alternatives to the Airbus A38X. However, the 747X family was unable to attract enough interest to enter production. A year later, Boeing switched from the 747X studies to pursue the Sonic Cruiser, and after the Sonic Cruiser program was put on hold, the 787 Dreamliner. Some of the ideas developed for the 747X were used on the 747-400ER, a longer range variant of the 747-400.

After several variants were proposed but abandoned, some industry observers became skeptical of new aircraft proposals from Boeing. However, in early 2004, Boeing announced plans for the 747 Advanced that were eventually adopted. Similar in nature to the 747-X, the stretched 747 Advanced used technology from the 787 to modernize the design and its systems. The 747 remained the largest passenger airliner in service until the Airbus A380 began airline service in 2007.

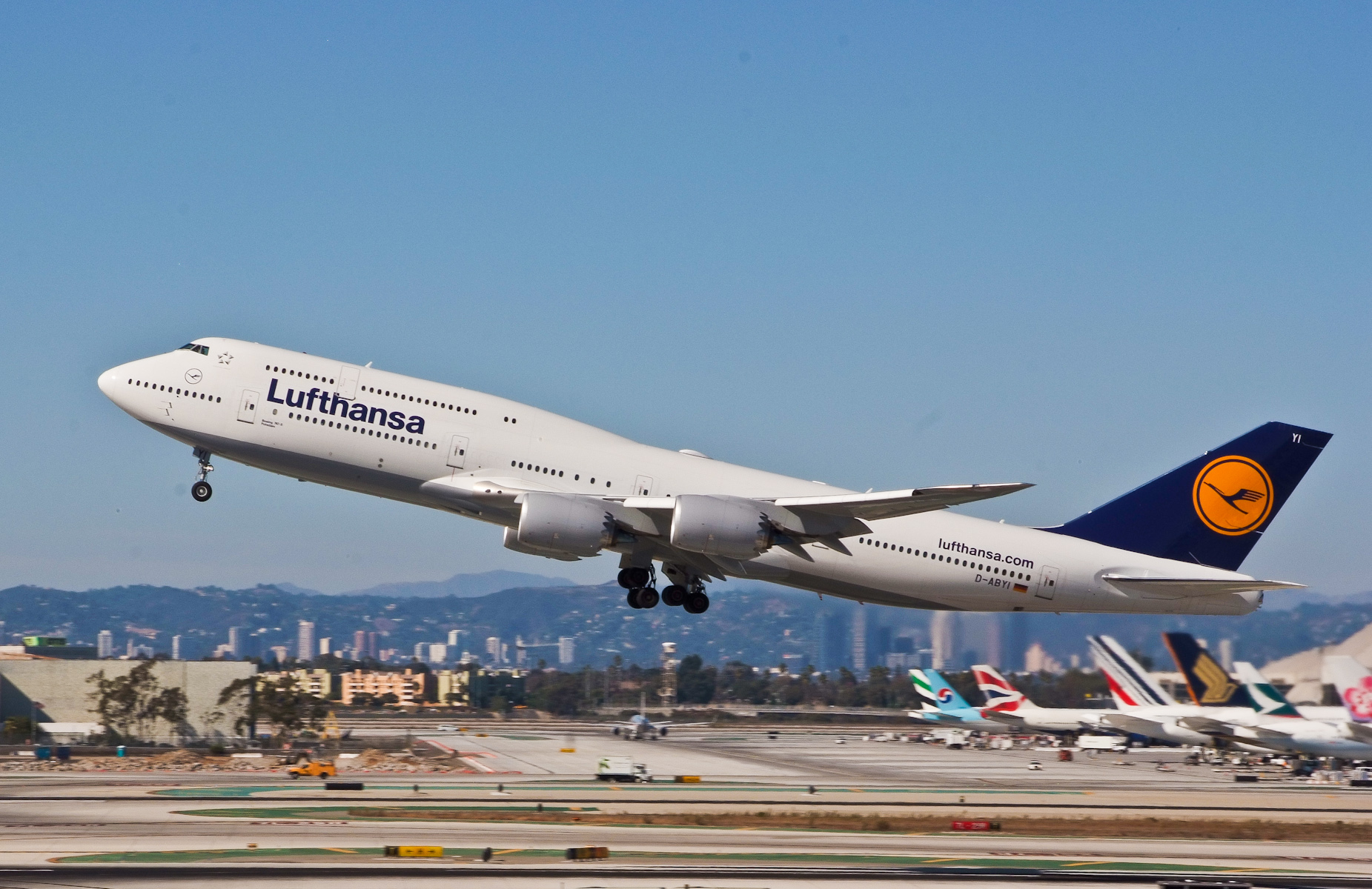
A Boeing 747-8 Intercontinental of Lufthansa

On November 14, 2005, Boeing announced it was launching the 747 Advanced as the Boeing 747-8. The last 747-400s were completed in 2009. As of 2011, most orders of the 747-8 were for the freighter variant. On February 8, 2010, the 747-8 Freighter made its maiden flight. The first delivery of the 747-8 went to Cargolux in 2011. The first 747-8 Intercontinental passenger variant was delivered to Lufthansa on May 5, 2012. The 1,500th Boeing 747 was delivered in June 2014 to Lufthansa.

In January 2016, Boeing stated it was reducing 747-8 production to six per year beginning in September 2016, incurring a $569 million post-tax charge against its fourth-quarter 2015 profits. At the end of 2015, the company had 20 orders outstanding. On January 29, 2016, Boeing announced that it had begun the preliminary work on the modifications to a commercial 747-8 for the next Air Force One presidential aircraft, then expected to be operational by 2020.

On July 12, 2016, Boeing announced that it had finalized an order from Volga-Dnepr Group for 20 747-8 freighters, valued at $7.58 billion (~$9.95 billion in 2025) at list prices. Four aircraft were delivered beginning in 2012. Volga-Dnepr Group is the parent of three major Russian air-freight carriers – Volga-Dnepr Airlines, AirBridgeCargo Airlines and Atran Airlines. The new 747-8 freighters would replace AirBridgeCargo's current 747-400 aircraft and expand the airline's fleet and will be acquired through a mix of direct purchases and leasing over the next six years, Boeing said.

=== End of production ===
On July 27, 2016, in its quarterly report to the Securities and Exchange Commission, Boeing discussed the termination of 747 production due to insufficient demand. With a firm order backlog of 21 aircraft and a production rate of six per year, program accounting had been reduced to 1,555 aircraft. In October 2016, UPS Airlines ordered 14 -8Fs to add capacity, with options for 14, added in February 2018 to increase the total to 28 -8Fs on order. The backlog then stood at 25 aircraft, though several of these were orders from airlines that no longer intended to take delivery.

On July 2, 2020, it was reported that Boeing planned to end 747 production in 2022 upon delivery of the remaining jets for UPS and the Volga-Dnepr Group, due to low demand. On July 29, 2020, Boeing confirmed that the final 747 would be delivered in 2022 as a result of "current market dynamics and outlook" stemming from the COVID-19 pandemic, according to CEO David Calhoun. The last aircraft, a 747-8F for Atlas Air registered N863GT, rolled off the production line on December 6, 2022, and was delivered on January 31, 2023. Boeing hosted an event at the Everett factory for thousands of workers as well as industry executives to commemorate the delivery.

== Design ==
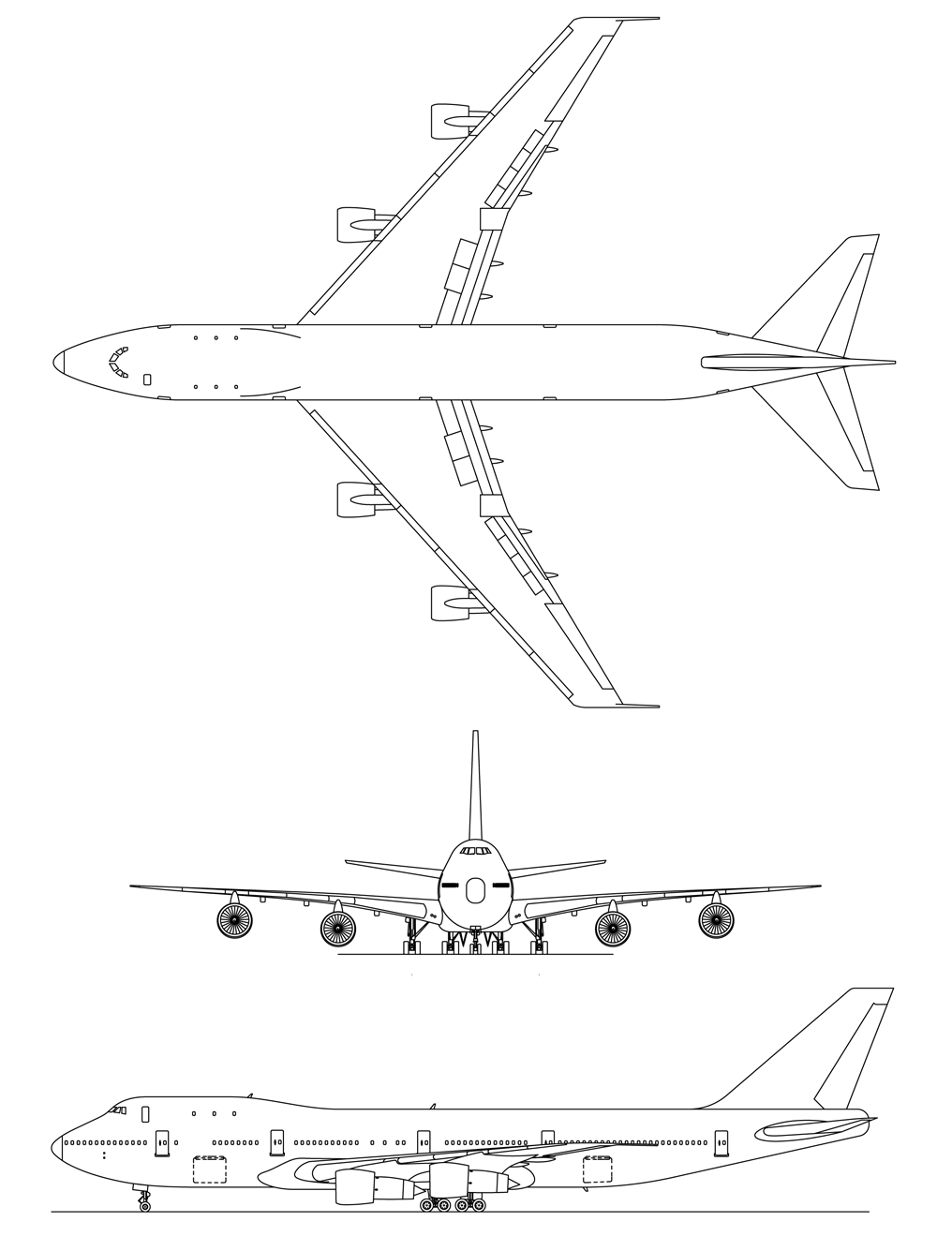
Three-view diagram of the original 747-100, showing its general configuration maintained in later variants

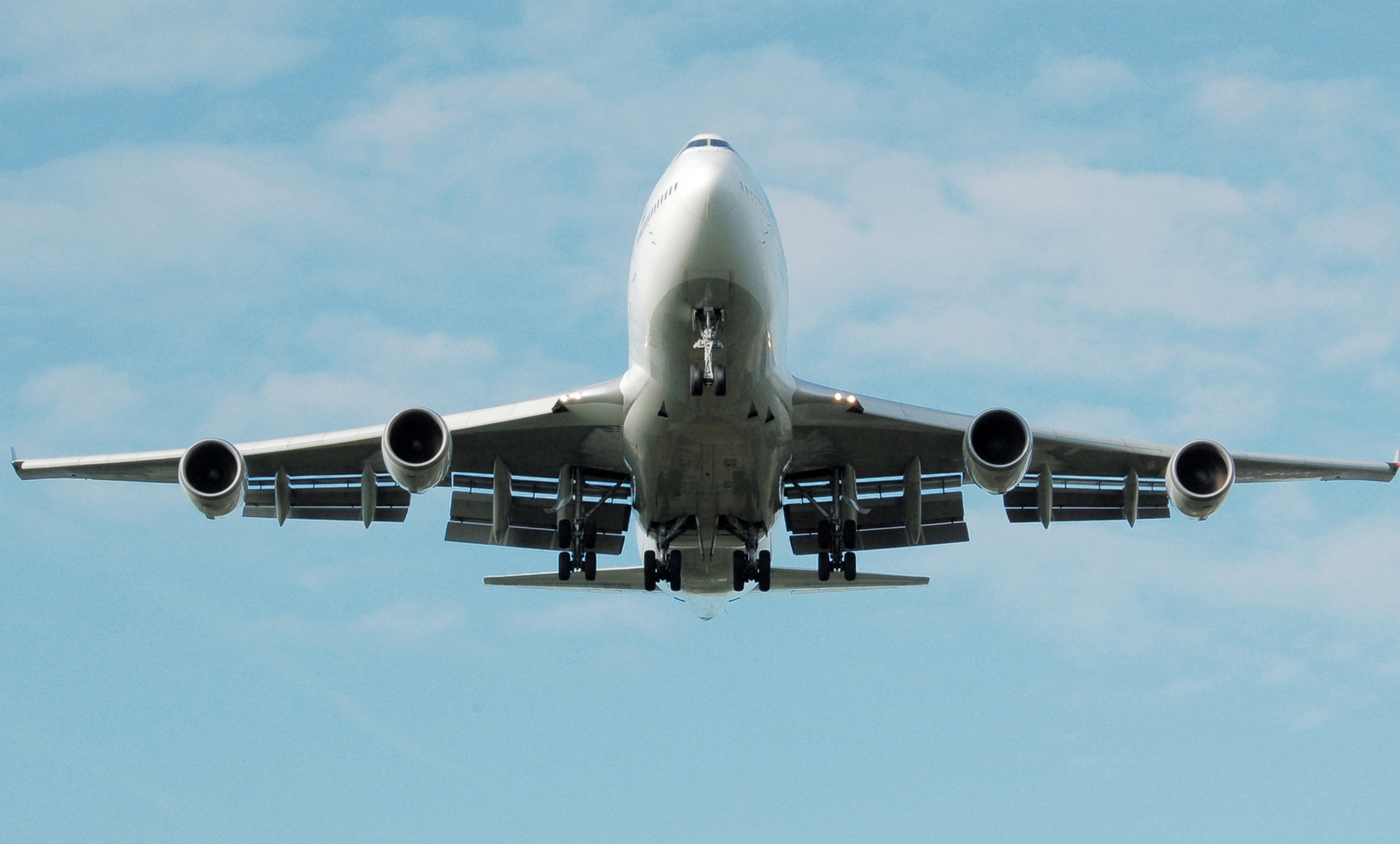
Front view showing the triple-slotted trailing edge flaps

The 747 is a large, wide-body (two-aisle) airliner with four wing-mounted engines. Its wings have a high sweep angle of 37.5° for a fast, efficient cruise speed of Mach 0.84 to 0.88, depending on the variant. The sweep also reduces the wingspan, allowing the 747 to use existing hangars. Its seating capacity is over 366 with a 3–4–3 seat arrangement (two aisles with three seats on each side and four seats in the middle) in economy class and a 2–3–2 layout in first class on the main deck. The upper deck has a 3–3 seat arrangement in economy class and a 2–2 layout in first class. Lavatories for later passenger models built from the 1980s onwards could be placed anywhere in the cabin through the installation of a central waste disposal system, dubbed the "sewer system", powered by an electric pump to provide suction. The "sewer system" was proposed by KLM chief engineer Gerald Lamb and initially tested on the Boeing 767 before its installation on 747s.

Seated 2 ft 7 in (0.79 m) above the floor of the main deck, the cockpit creates a hump. This raised cockpit allows front loading of cargo on freight variants. The upper deck behind the cockpit provides space for a lounge and/or extra seating. Some operators also configured the upper deck with features other than passenger seating or lounges, such as the Skybeds of Philippine Airlines' 747-200Bs, which provided passengers with genuine beds fitted with seatbelts, enabling them to sleep during long-haul sectors. The "stretched upper deck" became available as an alternative on the 747-100B variant and later as a standard configuration beginning with the 747-300. The upper deck was stretched further on the 747-8. The 747 cockpit roof section also has an escape hatch, from which the cockpit crew can exit during an emergency if they cannot do so through the cabin. An inertial reel attached to a cable is provided for each crew member to hold onto while exiting through the hatch and sliding down to the ground.

The 747's maximum takeoff weight ranges from 735,000 pounds (333 t) for the -100 to 970,000 pounds (440 t) for the -8. Its range has increased from 5,300 nautical miles (9,800 km; 6,100 mi) on the -100 to 8,000 nautical miles (15,000 km; 9,200 mi) on the -8I.

The 747 has redundant structures along with four redundant hydraulic systems and four sets of four-wheeled main landing gears, two on the wing roots and two beneath the main fuselage, that are accompanied by a two-wheeled nose gear; these provide good support on the ground and safety in case of tire blow-outs. The main gear is redundant so that landing can be performed on two opposing landing gears if the others are not functioning properly. The bogies on the main fuselage are positioned behind the wing to accommodate heavy payloads and balance the load away from the nose gear, especially during takeoff and landing. The ground steering system of the landing gear enables the main gear bogies to move in concert with the nose gear.

All tires on the landing gear are tubeless and identical in size to facilitate interchangeability. Wheels on the main gear units of Classic variants were fitted with steel anti-skid disk brakes that take up to 2 hours to cool down and could catch fire if the energy per brake exceeded 30,000,000 foot-pounds force (41,000,000 J), a scenario usually caused by severe braking inputs and observed in rejected takeoffs. To minimize the overheating issues with steel brakes, the 747-400 was designed with carbon brakes for faster cooling. The -400 also provided instrumentation that enabled the cockpit panel to display tire pressure values.

The 747 has split control surfaces and was designed with sophisticated triple-slotted flaps that minimize landing speeds and allow the 747 to use standard-length runways.

To transport spare engines, the 747 can accommodate a non-functioning fifth-pod engine under the aircraft's port wing between the inner functioning engine and the fuselage. Use of the fifth engine pod increases drag on the left side of the aircraft, which pilots need to compensate for to maintain a consistent heading, sometimes by offsetting the rudder to the right side at cruise. When Air India Flight 182, operated by a 747-237B named Emperor Kanishka, broke apart over the Atlantic Ocean while ferrying a fifth engine on a scheduled flight from Montréal to London's Heathrow Airport on June 23, 1985, investigators considered the fifth engine pod a potential threat to the structural integrity of the 747's airframe. It was eventually ruled out as a cause of the crash after evaluation of the aircraft's flight data recorder (FDR) found no anomalies in the aircraft's handling, and the incident was revealed to have been caused by a terrorist bombing. The fifth engine mount point was used by Virgin Orbit's LauncherOne program to carry an orbital-class rocket to cruise altitude where it was deployed.

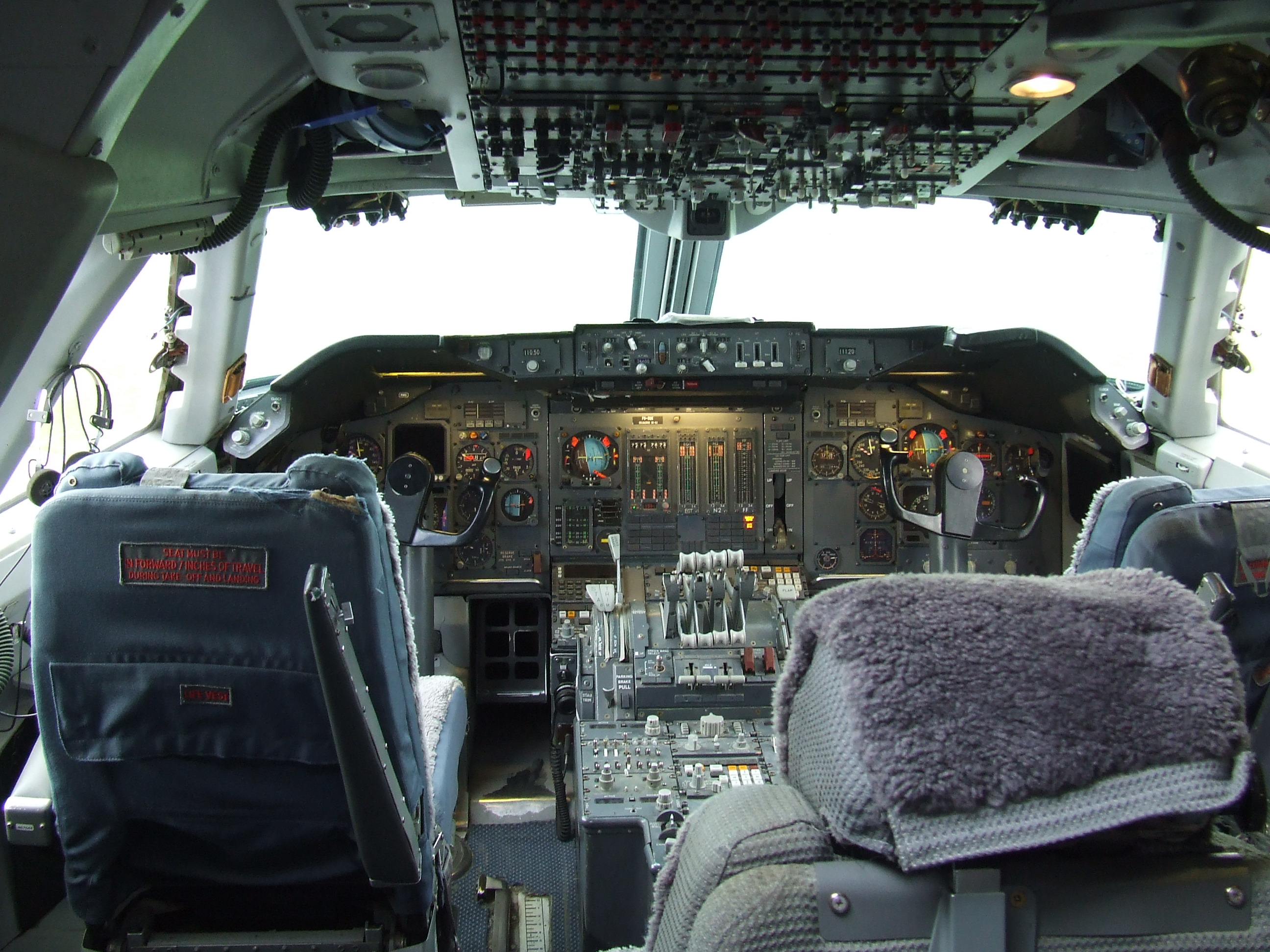
Cockpit of a 747-200 with the optional "tape"-style indicators used by some airlines.

The 747 Classic variants, comprising the -100/200/300/SP, were designed to be flown by two pilots and a flight engineer relying on then-innovative electro-mechanical analog instruments for flight operations, which are either dual or triple redundant. Specifications of individual aircraft were delivered in accordance with the requests of their respective customers, who were given the option to customize cockpit layouts through means such as choosing to install either dial or tape-style gauges. The introduction of digital cockpit displays on the 747-400 later gave pilots the option to choose between displaying either dial or tape-style indicators by programming the display driver without the need to reinstrument the cockpit as was done for the Classic variants' analog cockpits. Unlike the earlier 707, the 747 did not need a navigator in the cockpit, as it was the first commercial aircraft to utilize an inertial navigation system (INS). Among the other advanced technologies included in the 747 were an autothrottle for automatic airspeed control and a performance management system (PMS).

The 747-400, launched in October 1985, replaced analog instruments with electronic flight instrument systems (EFIS) similar to those of the Boeing 757 and 767. These technologies reduced the number of cockpit instruments to 300 indicators and 200 switches from the nearly 690 dials and lights and 280 switches found in Classic variants, and they also enabled the -400 to be manned by two pilots, eliminating the flight engineer's position of previous variants.

On average, a 747 Classic airframe has approximately 135 miles (215 km) of electrical wiring and 1 mile (1.6 km) of hydraulics to power its systems. The wiring was reduced by about 30% for the 747-400.

== Operational history ==
=== Commercial service ===
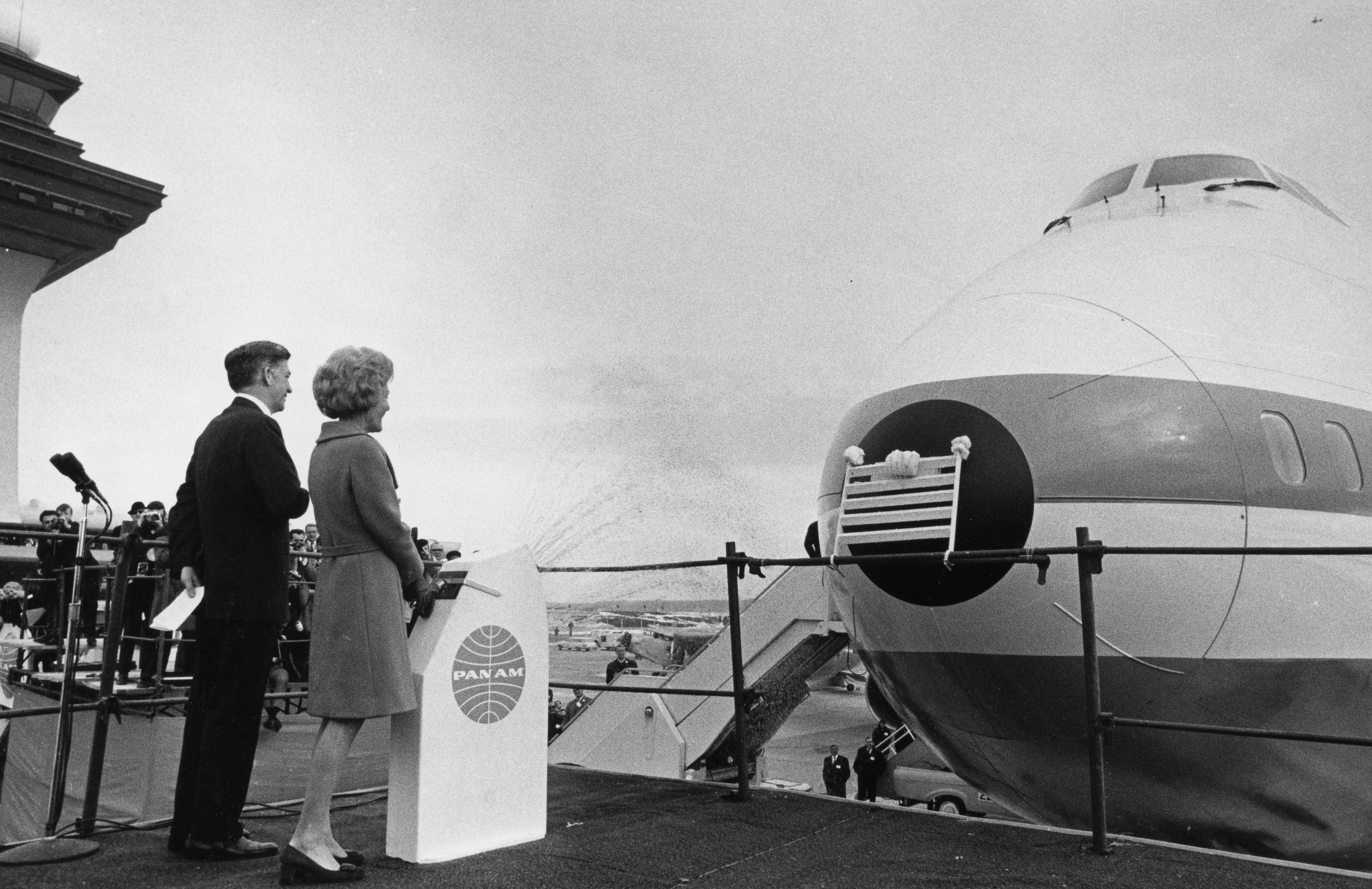
First Lady Pat Nixon christened the first commercial 747 on January 15, 1970.

On January 15, 1970, First Lady Pat Nixon christened Pan Am's first 747 at Dulles International Airport in the presence of Pan Am chairman Najeeb Halaby. Instead of champagne, red, white, and blue water was sprayed on the aircraft. The 747 then subsequently entered service on January 22, 1970, on Pan Am's New York–London route. The flight had been planned for the evening of January 21 but was delayed due to engine overheating on the original aircraft (Clipper Young America, registration N735PA). Finding a substitute delayed the flight by more than six hours to the following day when Clipper Victor (registration N736PA) was used. The 747 enjoyed a fairly smooth introduction into service, overcoming concerns that some airports would not be able to accommodate an aircraft that large. Although technical problems occurred, they were relatively minor and quickly solved.

After the aircraft's introduction with launch customer Pan Am in 1970, many other airlines that had bought the 747 to stay competitive began to put their own 747s into service. Within months after the inaugural 747 service, Pan Am faced competition on international routes from other US-based carriers, such as Trans World Airlines (TWA) and Northwest Airlines, as well as foreign carriers like Air France, Lufthansa, and Japan Airlines. Lufthansa would inaugurate the first 747 freighter service with the introduction of the 747-200F in 1972 and remained the sole freighter operator until more airlines placed orders for 747 freighters in 1974.

Boeing estimated that half of the early 747 sales were to airlines desiring the aircraft's long range rather than its payload capacity. While the 747 had the lowest potential operating cost per seat, this could only be achieved when the aircraft was fully loaded; costs per seat increased rapidly as occupancy declined. A moderately loaded 747, one with only 70 percent of its seats occupied, used more than 95 percent of the fuel needed by a fully occupied 747. Nonetheless, many flag-carriers purchased the 747 due to its prestige, "even if it made no sense economically" to operate.

During its production run, the 747 primarily faced competition from the McDonnell Douglas DC-10 and Lockheed L-1011. Whereas domestic airlines in the United States preferred the smaller DC-10 and L-1011 (and later the Airbus A300 and Boeing 767 twinjets) due to having insufficient passenger traffic to operate 747s economically, international carriers worldwide preferred the 747 over its contemporaries for its range. Many international carriers used the 747 on Pacific routes, while ANA and Japan Airlines deployed short-range 747 models on Japanese domestic routes. International flights bypassing traditional hub airports and landing at smaller cities became more common throughout the 1980s, thus eroding the 747's original market.

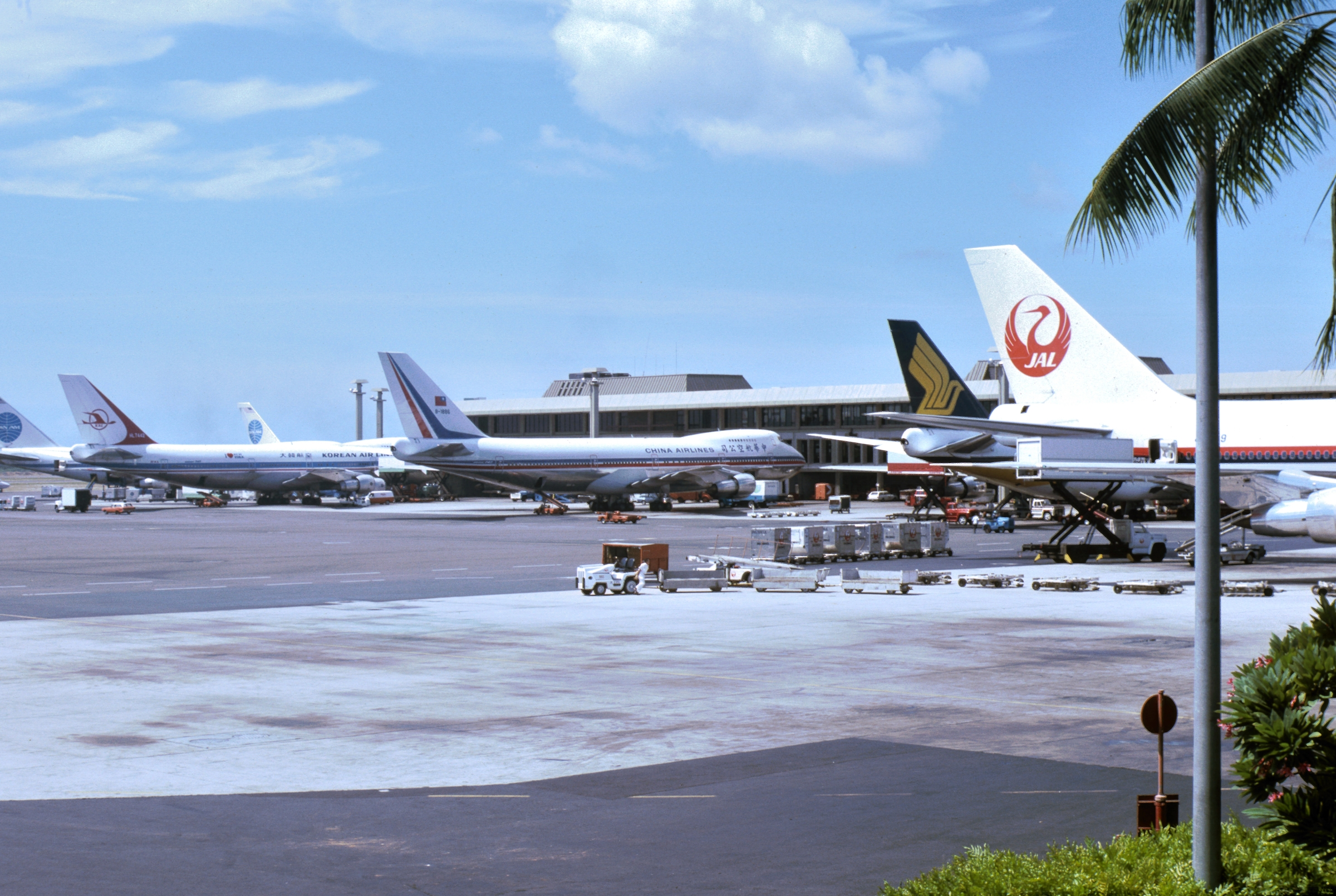
747s at Honolulu International Airport in 1981. The 747 was a common sight at airports along the Pacific Ocean.

By 1982, a total of 542 747s were in active service. It was most prominent in the Asia-Pacific region, where 169 examples, 31% of the global fleet, were in service with airlines based in the region. During a business trip to Japan, chief designer Joe Sutter, who wrote about his personal habit of watching 747s at airports beginning the mid-1980s, estimated that, assuming each aircraft was at most 75% occupied, 55 747s arriving at Narita Airport within a 2-hour period would have carried as many as 20,000 people.

While the design team assumed that a decrease in demand for passenger 747s would come early in the 747's introduction in the 1970s as a result of increased interest in the supersonic airliners in development at the time, such as Concorde and the cancelled Boeing 2707, and designed the 747 for easy conversion of surplus passenger airframes into a freight configuration for that reason, this ultimately did not happen; instead, the decrease happened much later than envisioned and was caused by the introduction of ETOPS-capable widebody twinjets from the 1980s to the 2000s, such as the Airbus A310 and A330 and Boeing's own 767, 777, and 787, which were more efficient to operate than the trijets and quadjets which preceded them. Indeed, tri- and quadjet designs from the same era – including the Airbus A380, which was designed to compete directly with the 747 – struggled to reach commercial success.

=== Government and military service ===
The 747 has seen military service worldwide either in dedicated fleets or through charter operations. It is typically used to transport government officials and other VIPs, but it has also been used for other purposes by the United States Air Force (USAF), which operates specially designed 747 variants, namely the E-4B airborne command posts of the National Emergency Airborne Command Post (NEACP) program and the VC-25 presidential transports. The 747 has also participated in the American space program through NASA's usage of two secondhand 747s, comprising one 747-100 from American Airlines and one 747SR from Japan Airlines, as the Shuttle Carrier Aircraft (SCA) and one ex-Pan Am 747SP as the Stratospheric Observatory For Infrared Astronomy (SOFIA).

The Islamic Republic of Iran Air Force (IRIAF), formerly the Imperial Iranian Air Force, was the only air force in the world with a dedicated fleet of 747 freighters. From 1975 to 2026, it operated a mix of brand-new and secondhand examples of 747-100 and -200 freighters, three of which were converted into KC-747 tankers. The type was retired from the IRIAF's inventory when the last operational airframes were destroyed by U.S. and Israeli missile strikes in March 2026.

The Israeli Air Force notably set a record with the 747 in 1991, when 1,087 passengers were flown in an El Al 747-200C during Operation Solomon, a covert operation to airlift Ethiopian Jews from Addis Ababa to Tel Aviv. The record set by the El Al 747-200C exceeded the maximum capacity of the 747-400, which typically carried between 416 and 524 passengers, and also broke a record previously held on December 29, 1974, by a Qantas 747-238B, named City of Melbourne, which carried 674 passengers, comprising 306 adults, 328 children, and 40 infants, from Darwin to Sydney following the devastation of Cyclone Tracy.

== Variants ==
The main variants of the Boeing 747 are the -100, SP, -200, -300, -400 and -8. There are other variants for other types of use, such as the VC-25, E-4 and the Dreamlifter.

== Operators ==
The 747 was utilized by various airlines from the Asia-Pacific region, the Americas, Europe, the Middle East, and Africa. Historically, it was the primary long-haul aircraft for operators like Air France, Air New Zealand, British Airways, Cathay Pacific, Japan Airlines, Lufthansa, Northwest Airlines, Pan Am, Qantas, Singapore Airlines, and United Airlines. Qantas notably became the first airline in the world to operate an all-747 fleet after the retirement of its last 707 in 1979. In 1984, Qantas operated a total of 25 aircraft.

The largest all-time operator of the 747 was Japan Airlines, which operated a total of 115 747s comprising 20 -100s, 34 -200s, 16 -300s, and 45 -400s.

During the Cold War, Boeing refused to sell 747s to the Soviet Union due to political tensions and suspicions of industrial espionage raised in the 1970s after delegates from the Soviet Ministry of Aviation Industry visited the Everett factory, in the guise of negotiating for the purchase of 25 747s, and attempted to obtain copies of a document pertaining to the 747's design objectives and criteria, which the design team successfully prevented.

As of July 2019, there were 462 Boeing 747s in airline service, with Atlas Air and British Airways being the largest operators with 33 747-400s each.

The last US passenger Boeing 747 was retired from Delta Air Lines in December 2017. The model flew for almost every American major carrier since its 1970 introduction. Delta flew three of its last four aircraft on a farewell tour, from Seattle to Atlanta on December 19 then to Los Angeles and Minneapolis/St Paul on December 20.

As the IATA forecast an increase in air freight from 4% to 5% in 2018 fueled by booming trade for time-sensitive goods, from smartphones to fresh flowers, demand for freighters is strong while passenger 747s are phased out. Of the 1,574 produced, 890 are retired; as of 2018, a small subset of those which were intended to be parted-out got $3 million D-checks before flying again. Young -400s were sold for 320 million yuan ($50 million) and Boeing stopped converting freighters, which used to cost nearly $30 million. This comeback helped the airframer financing arm Boeing Capital to shrink its exposure to the 747-8 from $1.07 billion in 2017 to $481 million in 2018.

In July 2020, British Airways announced that it was retiring its 747 fleet. The final British Airways 747 flights departed London Heathrow on October 8, 2020.

=== Orders and deliveries ===
Year	Total	2023	2022	2021	2020	2019	2018	2017	2016	2015	2014	2013	2012	2011	2010	2009	2008	2007	2006
Orders	1,573	–	–	5	1	–	13	6	18	6	2	13	7	3	1	5	2	16	53
Deliveries	1,573	1	5	7	5	7	6	14	9	18	19	24	31	9	–	8	14	16	14

Year	2005	2004	2003	2002	2001	2000	1999	1998	1997	1996	1995	1994	1993	1992	1991	1990	1989	1988	1987	1986
Orders	46	10	4	17	16	26	35	15	36	56	32	16	2	23	31	122	56	49	66	84
Deliveries	13	15	19	27	31	25	47	53	39	26	25	40	56	61	64	70	45	24	23	35

Year	1985	1984	1983	1982	1981	1980	1979	1978	1977	1976	1975	1974	1973	1972	1971	1970	1969	1968	1967	1966
Orders	42	23	24	14	23	49	72	76	42	14	20	29	29	18	7	20	30	22	43	83
Deliveries	24	16	22	26	53	73	67	32	20	27	21	22	30	30	69	92	4	–	–	–

Boeing 747 orders and deliveries (cumulative, by year):

Orders Deliveries — as of February 2023

=== Model summary ===
Model Series	ICAO code	Deliveries	
747-100	B741 / BSCA (Note: BSCA refers to the 747 Shuttle Carrier Aircraft, used by NASA.)	167	205
747-100B	B741 / BSCA	9	205
747-100SR	B74R	29	205
747SP	B74S	45	45
747-200B	B742	225 (Note: Includes the VC-25A, two heavily modified 747-200Bs used for presidential transport by the U.S. Air Force.)	393
747-200C	B742	13	393
747-200F	B742	73	393
747-200M	B742	78	393
747 E-4A	B742	3 (Note: All aircraft were later converted to E-4Bs.)	393
747 E-4B	B742	1	393
747-300	B743	56	81
747-300M	B743	21	81
747-300SR	B743	4	81
747-400	B744 / BLCF (Note: BLCF refers to the 747-400LCF Dreamlifter, used to transport components for the Boeing 787 Dreamliner program.)	442	694
747-400ER	B744 / BLCF	6	694
747-400ERF	B744 / BLCF	40	694
747-400F	B744 / BLCF	126	694
747-400M	B744 / BLCF	61	694
747-400D	B74D	19	694
747-8I	B748	48	155
747-8F	B748	107	155
747 Total		1,573	

Orders and deliveries through to the end of February 2023.

== Accidents and incidents ==
As of March 2026, the 747 has been involved in 174 aviation accidents and incidents, including 65 hull losses (53 in-flight accidents and 32 fatal), causing 3,746 fatalities. The deadliest air accident of all time, the Tenerife airport disaster, involved two Boeing 747 aircraft, KLM Flight 4805 and Pan Am Flight 1736, which collided on the runway at Los Rodeos Airport killing 583 people.

== Preserved aircraft ==
=== Aircraft on display ===
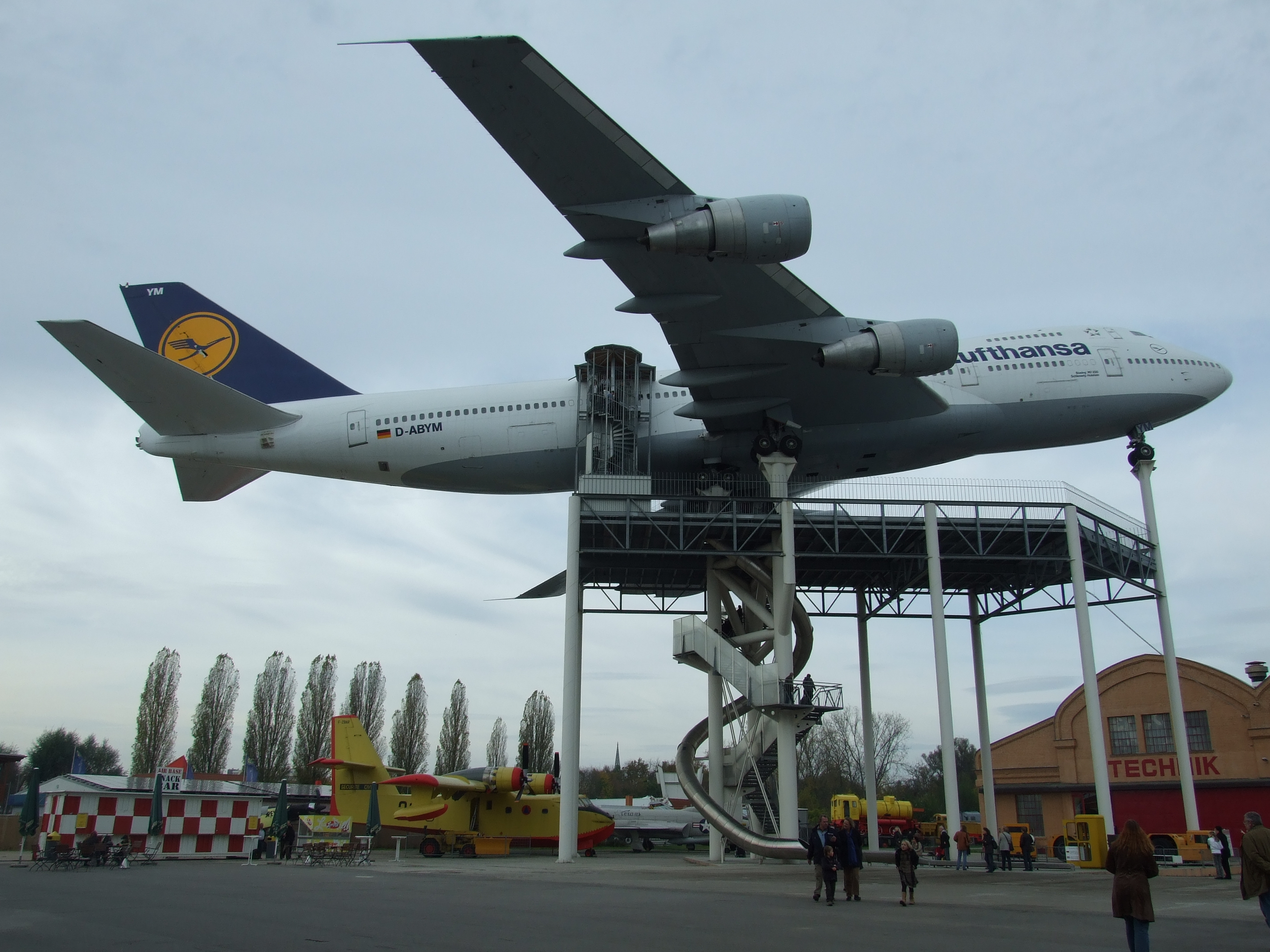
Lufthansa Boeing 747-230B D-ABYM on display at the Technikmuseum Speyer in Germany

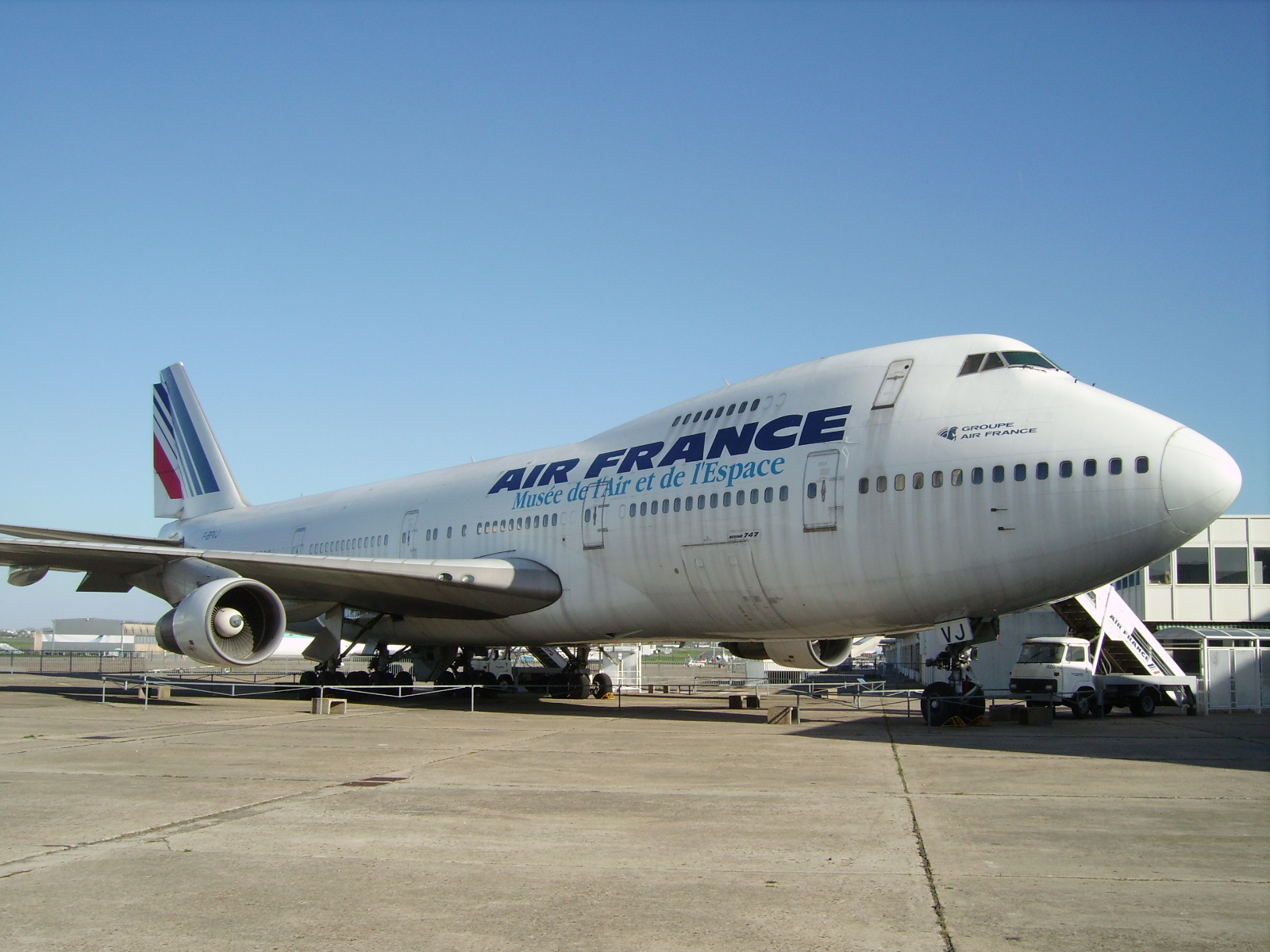
Boeing 747-128 on display at the Musée de l'Air et de l'Espace in France

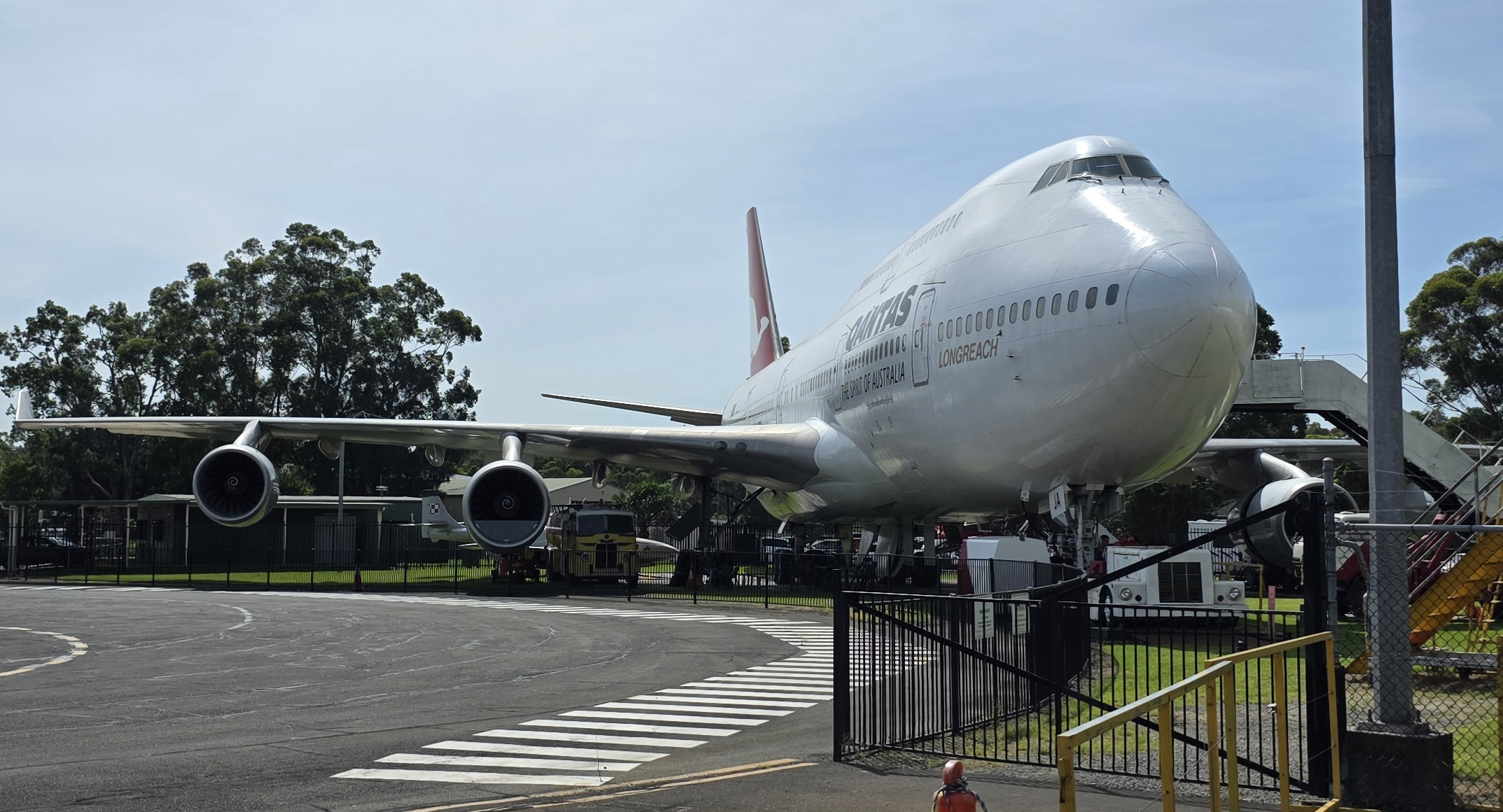
VH-OJA City of Canberra at HARS, Shellharbour Airport

As increasing numbers of "classic" 747-100 and 747-200 series aircraft have been retired, some have been used for other uses such as museum displays. Some older 747-300s and 747-400s were later added to museum collections.

- 20235/001 – 747-121 registration N7470 City of Everett, the first 747 and prototype, is at the Museum of Flight, Seattle, Washington.
- 19651/025 – 747-121 registration N747GE at the Pima Air & Space Museum, Tucson, Arizona, US.
- 19661/070 – 747-121(SF) registration N681UP on display at Shengshi Li Outlet in Cixi, Ningbo, Zhejiang, China. After retirement, it was stored at the Shanghai World Expo site and in Yangpu District, Shanghai, before being relocated to Ningbo.
- 19778/027 – 747-151 registration N601US nose at the National Air and Space Museum, Washington, D.C.
- 19780/045 – 747-151 registration N603US, is currently stored intact at Laurinburg-Maxton Airport in North Carolina, US.
- 19896/072 – 747-132(SF) registration N481EV at the Evergreen Aviation & Space Museum, McMinnville, Oregon, US.
- 20107/086 – 747-123 registration N905NA, a NASA Shuttle Carrier Aircraft, at the Johnson Space Center, Houston, Texas, US.
- 20269/150 – 747-136 registration G-AWNG nose at Hiller Aviation Museum, San Carlos, California.
- 20239/160 – 747-244B registration ZS-SAN nicknamed Lebombo, at the South African Airways Museum Society, Rand Airport, Johannesburg, South Africa.
- 20541/200 – 747-128 registration F-BPVJ at Musée de l'Air et de l'Espace, Paris, France.
- 20770/213 – 747-2B5B registration HL7463 at Jeongseok Aviation Center, Jeju, South Korea.
- 20713/219 - 747-212B(SF) registration N482EV at the Evergreen Aviation & Space Museum, McMinnville, Oregon, US.
- 20781/221 – 747SR-46 registration N911NA, originally built as the first 747SR for Japan Airlines as JA8117, and later converted into a NASA Shuttle Carrier Aircraft, at Joe Davies Heritage Airpark, California, US.
- 20825/223 - 747-200 registration SX-OAB at the site of Ellinikon International Airport, Athens, Greece. After over 20 years sitting at the closed airport, it was moved to a permanent location within the boundaries of the airport and put on display as part of the ongoing regeneration work.
- 21134/288 – 747SP-44 registration ZS-SPC at the South African Airways Museum Society, Rand Airport, Johannesburg, South Africa.
- 21441/306 - Stratospheric Observatory for Infrared Astronomy (SOFIA) - 747SP-21 registration N747NA at Pima Air and Space Museum in Tucson, Arizona, US. Former Pan Am and United Airlines 747SP bought by NASA and converted into a flying telescope, for astronomy purposes. Named Clipper Lindbergh.
- 21549/336 – 747-206B registration PH-BUK at the Aviodrome, Lelystad, Netherlands.
- 21588/342 – 747-230B(M) registration D-ABYM preserved at Technik Museum Speyer, Germany.
- 22145/410 – 747-238B registration VH-EBQ at the Qantas Founders Museum, Longreach, Australia.
- 21684/391 – 747-212B registration SX-OAD cockpit section is on display at the South Wales Aviation Museum at St Athan, Wales. The main airframe was stored at Bruntingthorpe for many years before being broken up in 2020, with only the nose section salvaged for static preservation.
- 21942/471 – 747-212B registration N642NW nose at the Museum of Aeronautical Science in Narita, Japan, near Narita International Airport.
- 22382/498 – 747-2F6B(SF) registration TF-ARN on display as an attraction at the Donghai Cloud Corridor in Dinghai, Zhoushan, Zhejiang, China. Formerly operated by Philippine Airlines and Air Atlanta Icelandic.
- 22455/515 – 747-256BM registration EC-DLD Lope de Vega nose at the National Museum of Science and Technology, A Coruña, Spain.
- 22489/611 – 747-3B5 registration HS-UTL is on display at Ratchathani University in Ubon Ratchathani, Thailand.
- 23244/621 – 747-312 registration F-GSKY is stored at Phoenix Goodyear Airport in Arizona.
- 23719/696 – 747-451 registration N661US at the Delta Flight Museum, Atlanta, Georgia, US. This particular plane was the first 747-400 in service, as well as the prototype.
- 24354/731 – 747-438 registration VH-OJA at Shellharbour Airport, Albion Park Rail, New South Wales, Australia.
- 25772/975 – 747-400M registration B-2468 at Shijingshan Amusement Park, Beijing, China.
- 25811/1018 – 747-436 registration G-CIVB preserved at Cotswold Airport, UK as an event space.

=== Other uses ===
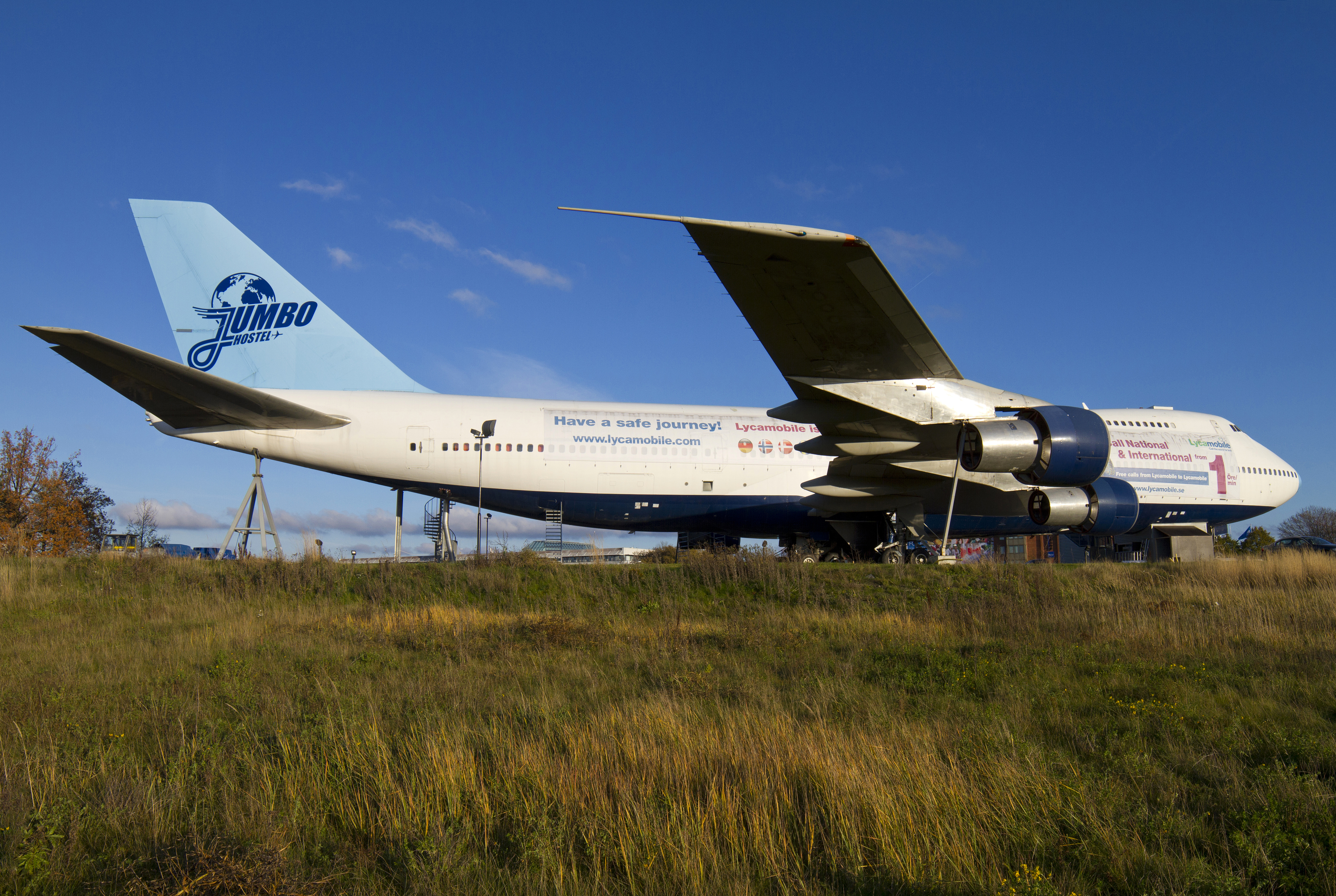
Boeing 747-212B serving as the Jumbo Stay at Arlanda Airport, Sweden

Upon its retirement from service, the 747 which was number two in the production line was dismantled and shipped to Hopyeong, Namyangju, Gyeonggi-do, South Korea where it was re-assembled, repainted in a livery similar to that of Air Force One and converted into a restaurant. Originally flown commercially by Pan Am as N747PA, Clipper Juan T. Trippe, and repaired for service following a tailstrike, it stayed with the airline until its bankruptcy. The restaurant closed by 2009, and the aircraft was scrapped in 2010.

A former British Airways 747-200B, G-BDXJ, is parked at the Dunsfold Aerodrome in Surrey, England and has been used as a movie set for productions such as the 2006 James Bond film, Casino Royale using the fictional registration N88892 and N9747P. The airplane also appears frequently in the television series Top Gear, which is filmed at Dunsfold.

The Jumbo Stay hostel, using a converted 747-200 formerly operated by Singapore Airlines and registered as 9V-SQE, opened at Arlanda Airport, Stockholm in January 2009. It closed in March 2025 after the owner declared bankruptcy.

A former Pakistan International Airlines 747-300 was converted into a restaurant by Pakistan's Airports Security Force in 2017. It is located at Jinnah International Airport, Karachi.

The wings of a 747 have been repurposed as roofs of a house in Malibu, California.

In 2023, a Boeing 747-412, retired from Lion Air, was turned into a steak restaurant in Bekasi, Indonesia. The aircraft had been sitting since 2018 but the construction of the restaurant was delayed due to the COVID-19 pandemic.

Two used 747-400s were cannibalized to build the Scaled Composites Stratolaunch aircraft.

In August 2026, two retired Boeing 747s were opened as luxury hotel suites within the "1975 Avenue & Hotel" lifestyle resort in Kempas, Johor Bahru, Malaysia. The resort features two full-size aircraft—a former Pan Am 747-121 (MSN 19650, Line Number 24, formerly registered as N743PA) and a former Japan Airlines short-range 747SR-146B (MSN 22067, Line Number 431, formerly registered as JA8143)—which were previously stored at Senai International Airport before being disassembled and transported to the hotel site in 2019 for reassembly. The interiors of both aircraft were completely gutted to accommodate 18 themed suites and a partially restored cockpit experience.

== Specifications (Boeing 747-200B, with JT9D-7R4G2 engines) ==
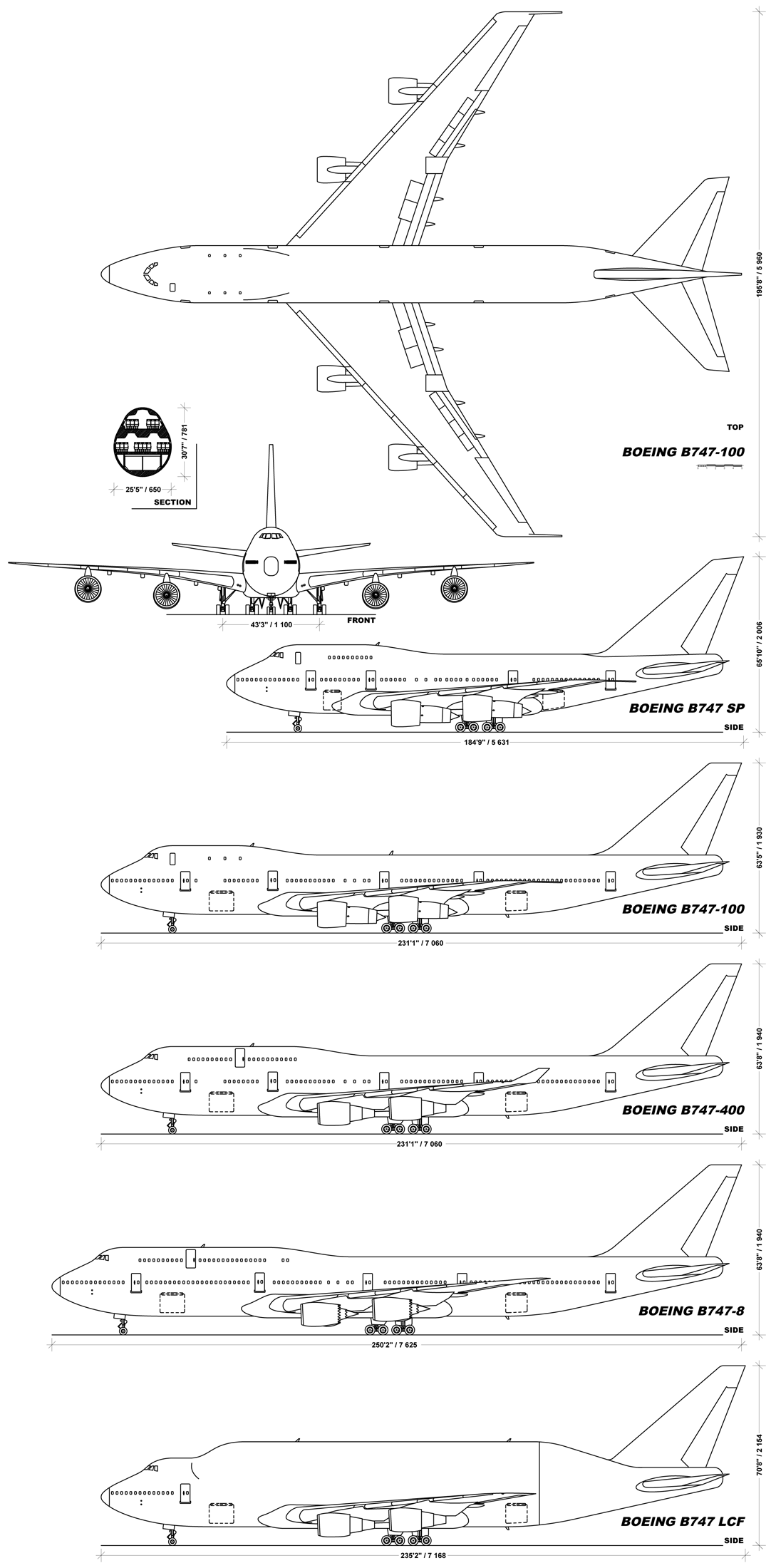
Diagram of Boeing 747 variants. At the top: 747-100 (dorsal, cross-section, and front views). Side views, in descending order: 747SP, 747-100, 747-400, 747-8I, and 747LCF.

Data from

General characteristics

- Crew: 3
- Capacity: 366 passengers, 5 cargo pallets, and 14 cargo containers (6,190 cu ft (175 m^{3}) total cargo space)
- Length: 225 ft 2 in (68.6 m)
- Wingspan: 195 ft 8 in (59.6 m)
- Height: 64 ft 3 in (19.6 m) with landing gear extended
- Empty weight: 375,100 lb (170,142 kg)
- Max takeoff weight: 833,000 lb (377,842 kg)
- Fuel capacity: 53,985 U.S. gal (204,360 L; 44,952 imp gal)
- Max landing weight: 564,000 lb (256,000 kg)
- Max zero fuel weight: 526,500 lb (238,800 kg)
- Powerplant: 4 × Pratt & Whitney JT9D-7R4G2 high bypass turbofan, 54,750 lbf (243.5 kN) thrust each

Performance

- Maximum speed: Mach 0.92
- Range: 7,550 mi (12,150 km, 6,560 nmi)
- Takeoff distance: 10,900 ft (3,300 m) at max takeoff weight
- Landing distance: 6,150 ft (1,870 m) at max landing weight

== Cultural impact ==
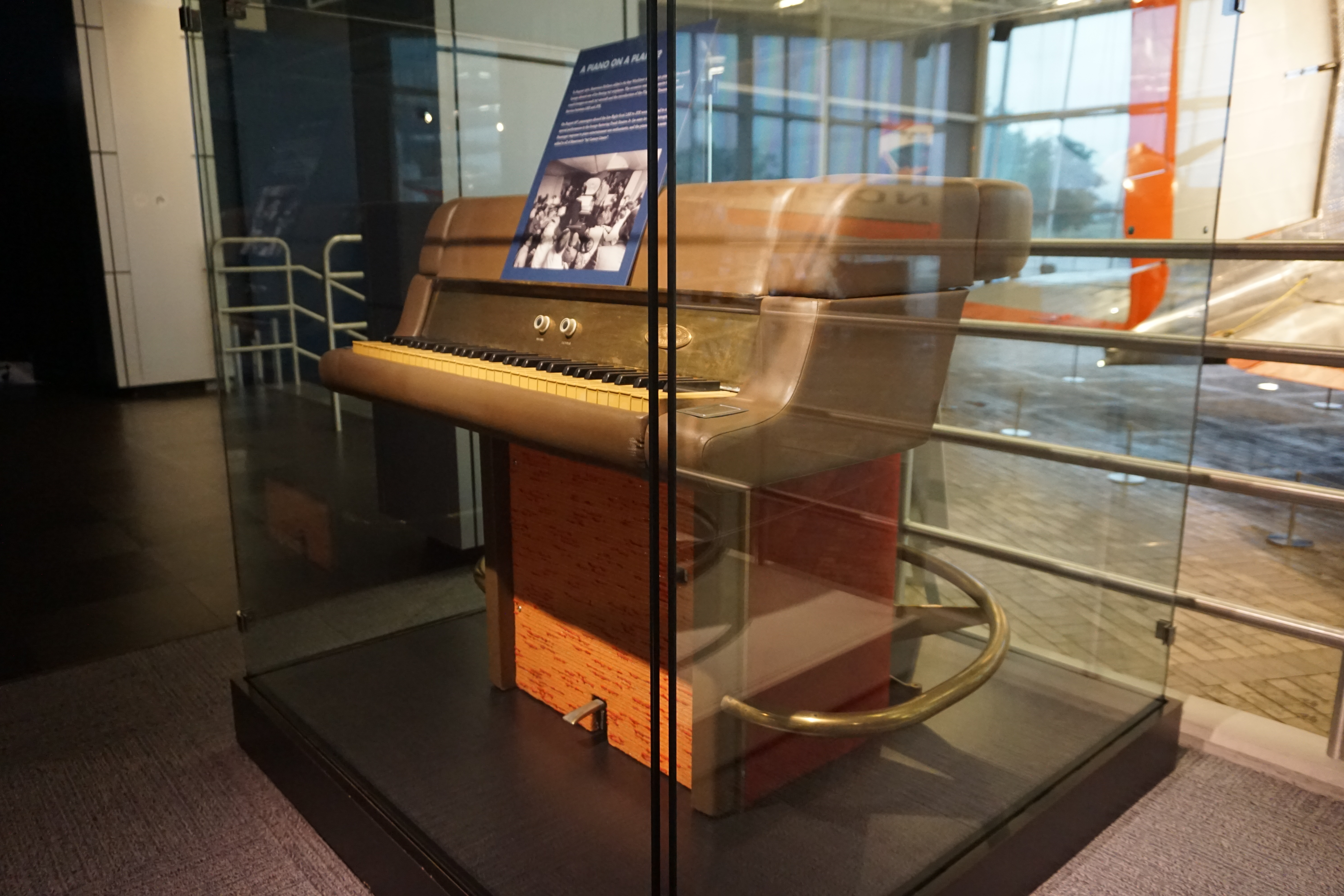
American Airlines 747 Wurlitzer electronic piano, 1971

Following its debut, the 747 rapidly achieved iconic status. The aircraft entered the cultural lexicon as the original Jumbo Jet, a term coined by the aviation media to describe its size, and was also nicknamed Queen of the Skies. Test pilot David P. Davies described it as "a most impressive aeroplane with a number of exceptionally fine qualities", and praised its flight control system as "truly outstanding" because of its redundancy.

Appearing in over 300 film productions, the 747 is one of the most widely depicted civilian aircraft and is considered by many as one of the most iconic in film history. It has appeared in film productions such as the disaster films Airport 1975 and Airport '77, as well as Air Force One, Die Hard 2, and Executive Decision.

Beyond its media presence, the 747's interior configuration introduced a physical social hierarchy within commercial aviation. With an increased seating capacity on the lower deck, ticket prices decreased and made long-haul travel more accessible. The upper deck promoted luxury, featuring sofas, bars, and premium amenities that began the formalization of the modern business and first-class cabin.

== See also ==
Related development

- Boeing 747 LCF
- Boeing 747-8
- Boeing 747-400
- Boeing 747SP
- Boeing E-4
- Boeing VC-25
- Shuttle Carrier Aircraft

Related lists

- List of tanker aircraft
- List of aircraft
- List of jet airliners
- List of megaprojects
