= Jumbo Stay =

Hostel in Stockholm, Sweden

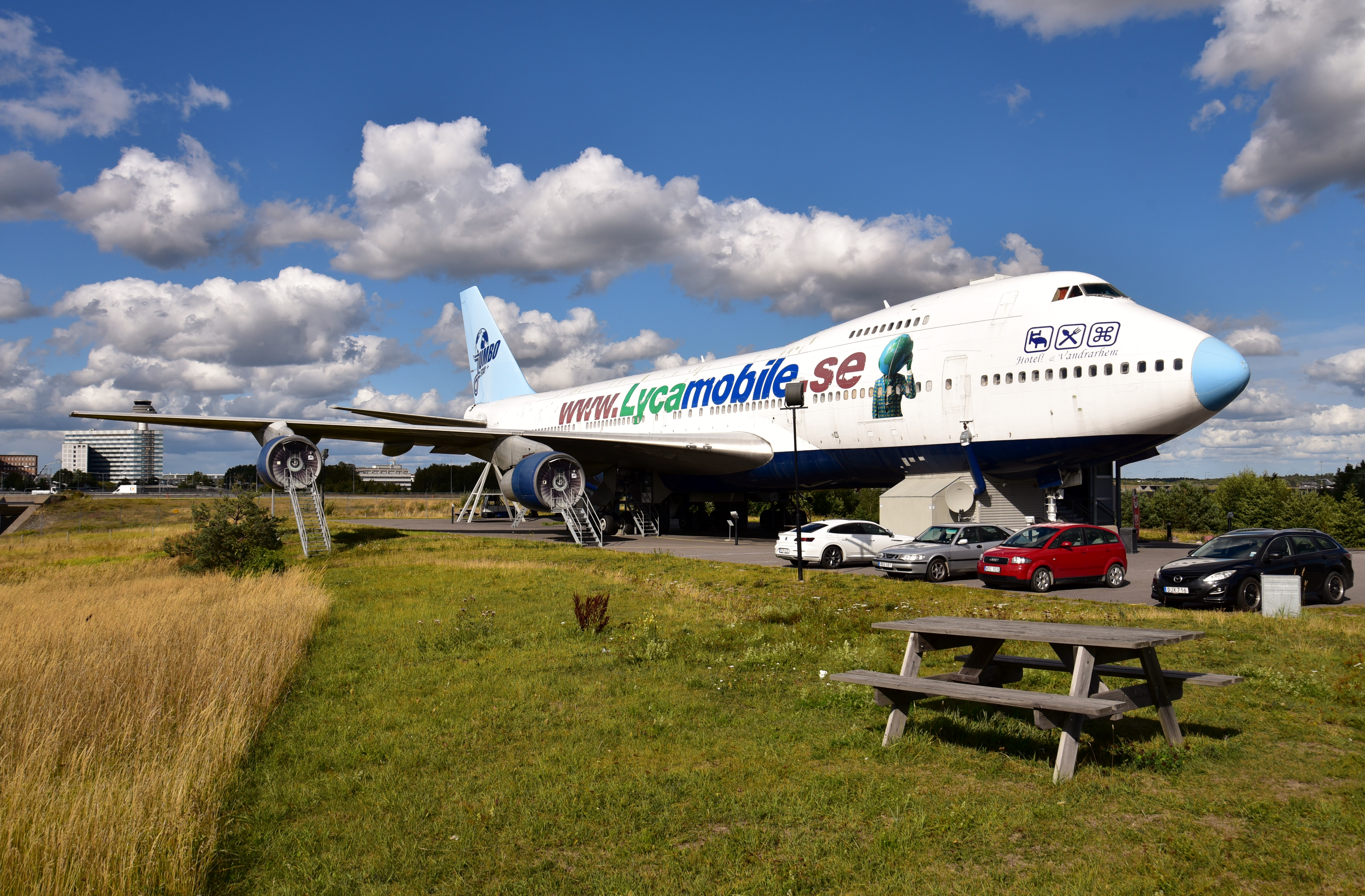
- Exterior view in 2019
- Interactive map of the Jumbo Stay area

General information
- Location: Arlanda Airport, Stockholm, Sweden
- Coordinates: 59°38′23″N 17°56′20″E
- Opening: 15 January 2009
- Closed: March 2025
- Owner: Oscar Diös

Technical details
- Floor count: 2

Other information
- Number of rooms: 33
- Number of suites: 2
- Number of restaurants: 1

Website
- www.jumbostay.com

Jumbo Stay (formerly the Jumbo Hostel) was a hostel and hotel located inside a decommissioned Boeing 747-200B aircraft, constructor's number 21162, at Stockholm Arlanda Airport, Sweden. It had 33 rooms, 76 beds, and officially opened in January 2009. In March 2025, the owner declared bankruptcy and closed the hotel.

== History ==
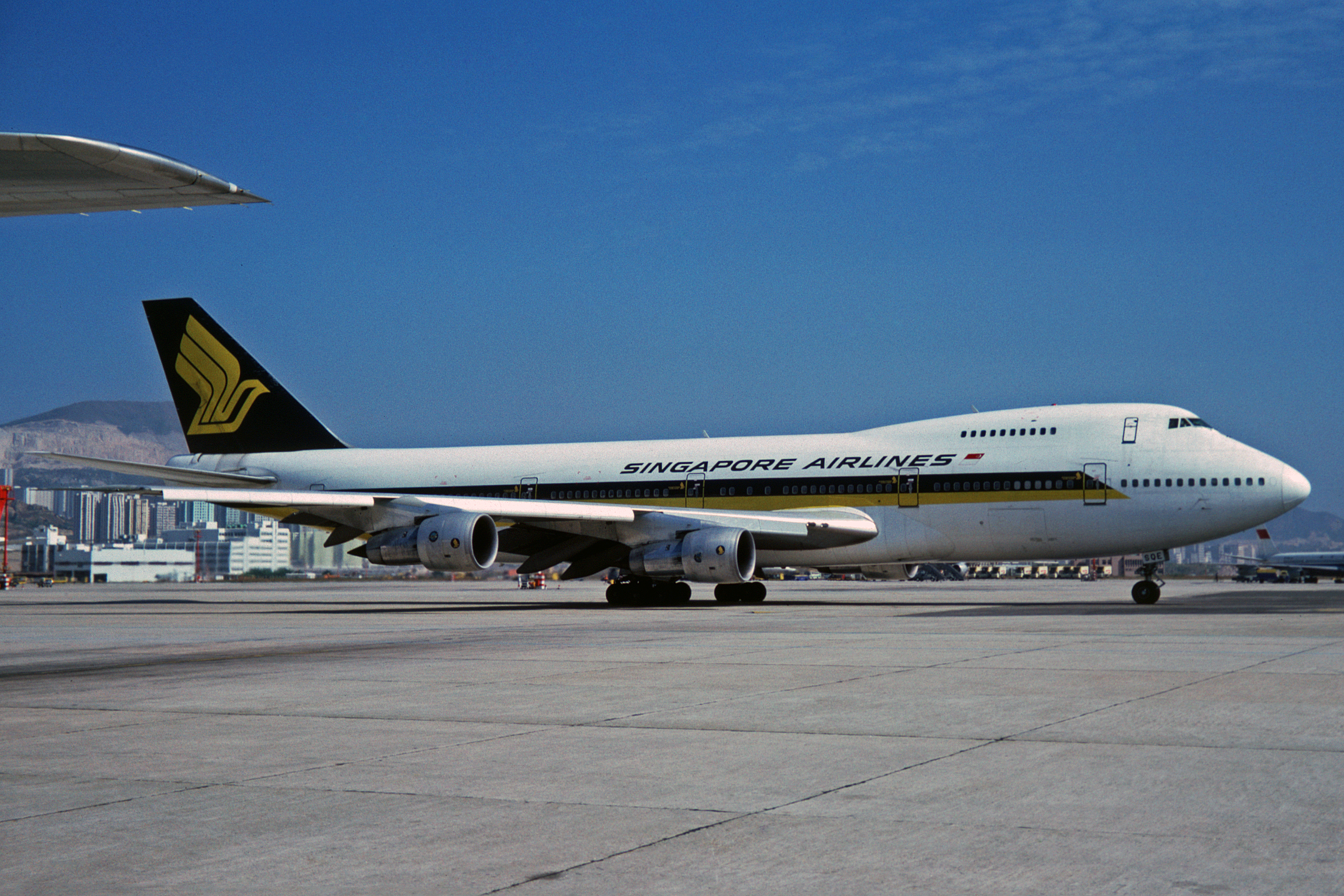
9V-SQE at Kai Tak Airport, Hong Kong in 1981

Jumbo Stay was housed within a preserved Boeing 747-200B. The 747 was built for Singapore Airlines, and entered service in 1976 under the registration 9V-SQE. In 1984, it was sold to Pan Am, for which it flew until 1991 as N727PA Clipper Belle of the Sky. Later, it operated for Cathay Pacific, Garuda Indonesia and others. Its last air operator was Transjet, a Swedish charter airline based at Arlanda Airport that went bankrupt in 2002.

The aircraft was subsequently acquired by Oscar Diös, who had previously run a youth hostel in Uppsala. Diös was developing a concept of running hostels inside many different objects, including boats, trains and lighthouses. When he found out that a retired aircraft was for sale at Arlanda Airport, he decided to try setting up an airport hostel inside it, as there were no hostels or budget hotels nearby. In December 2007, the municipality of Sigtuna granted him a building permit to establish a hostel within the aircraft at the entrance to the airport.

Following a restoration that began in January 2008 and cost the equivalent of more than US$3,000,000, the aircraft was towed in Summer 2008 to its new permanent location on a grass-covered mound outside the airport's perimeter. Its interior had been almost entirely changed, including the removal of 450 seats. However, a selection of its features, such as the flight controls and some of the original seats and windows, had been retained.

At its permanent site, the aircraft was mounted on a concrete foundation, and its landing gear was secured in two steel cradles. Additionally, a set of metal stairs and a lift were installed at the main entrance on the left side.

The owner began taking bookings in late 2008, and officially opened the transformed aircraft as "Jumbo Hostel" on 15 January 2009. He also named it "Liv", after his daughter. Since then, the business name has been changed to "Jumbo Stay".

In March 2025, the owner of the hotel filed for bankruptcy and closed the hotel.>

== Description ==
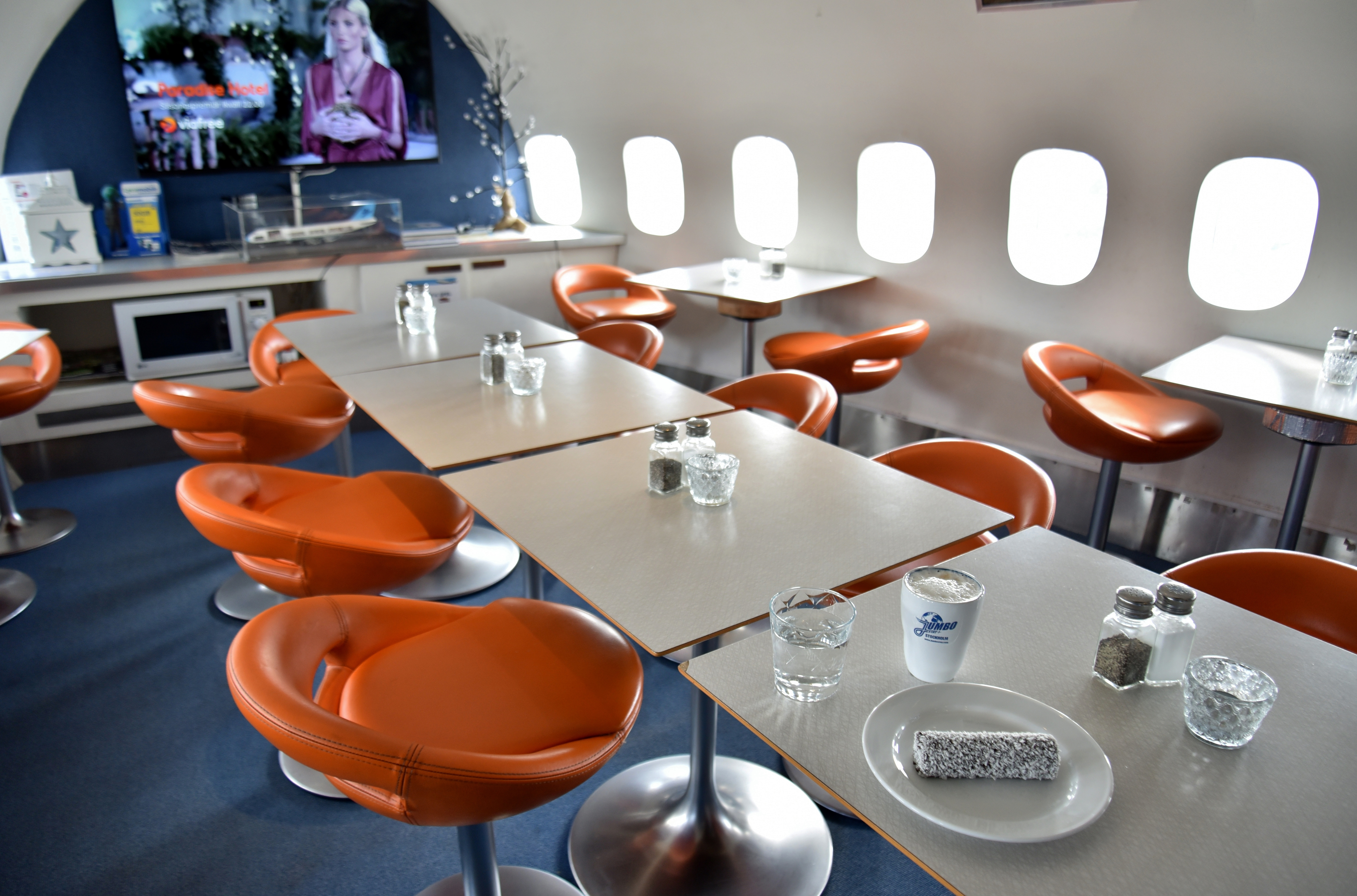
The cafe in 2019

Jumbo Stay is described by its operator as both a hostel and a hotel. It has 33 rooms with up to four beds in each. Altogether, it holds 76 beds. A large room, branded as "The Cockpit Suite", is located on the upper deck. It has a pilot's eye view through the front windows, and is equipped with an ensuite shower and toilet. A second suite, similarly equipped, is branded as "The Black Box Suite". All of the other rooms are about 6 m^{2} (65 sq ft) in size and have access to shared bathrooms. Some of those rooms are located in the engine nacelles or wheel wells.

The former first-class area at the front of the aircraft has been converted into a cafe that serves breakfasts, snacks and light beverages. There are also microwave ovens for those who wish to self cater. The cafe is open to day visitors as well as guests staying overnight. In the upper deck, there is a conference lounge with eight first-class flight seats. Outside, the left-side wing has been converted into a patio and observation deck, from which aircraft moving along a nearby taxiway can be spotted.

According to the owner, the most challenging aspect of the renovation was to build something inside the aircraft's hull. Only 353 m^{2} (3,800 sq ft) of space was available for the rooms, cafe and lounge.

Jumbo Stay is "a 15-minute walk" from the airport terminal and can be reached by free shuttle bus. It can also be booked for special occasions. Civil wedding ceremonies can be held on the observation deck, and receptions can be hosted in the cafe or conference lounge.
