= .303 =

.303 may refer to:

- .303 British, a rifle cartridge
- .303 Savage, a rifle cartridge
- Lee–Enfield rifle
- .303 (film), a short film

== See also ==
- 303 (disambiguation)
