= Out Here =

Out Here may refer to:

- Out Here (Love album), 1969
- Out Here (Christian McBride album), 2013
- "Out Here", a 2005 song by Pendulum from Hold Your Colour
- "Out Here", a 2019 song by British girl group 303
- "Out Here", a 2023 song by Steven Lee Olsen

== See also ==
- Out of Here (disambiguation)
- Out There (disambiguation)
