= 303 (disambiguation) =

303 is a year of the Julian calendar.

303 may also refer to:

- 303 (number)
- 303 BC, a year of the pre-Julian Roman calendar
- Area code 303, a telephone code assigned to central Colorado
- Roland TB-303, a bass synthesizer
- .303 British, the .303" calibre rifle and machine-gun cartridge
- 303 (comics), comic book miniseries by Garth Ennis and Jacen Burrows
- 303 Josephina, a main-belt asteroid
- Prometheus (Stargate), also called BC-303 or X-303, fictional spacecraft in the Stargate SG-1 television show
- 3OH!3, an electropop band from Boulder, Colorado
- "303", also used in Australia and New Zealand to refer to the Lee–Enfield rifle
- "303", a song by Kula Shaker from the album K

A303 road, a British Highway that is the subject of the Kula Shaker song

- HTTP 303, a status code for "See other"
- SOP 303, a National Communications System standard operating procedure to turn off mobile communications
- 303 (film), a German film
- 303 (group), a British girl group
- Pearson 303, an American sailboat design
- 303 Squadron (disambiguation), several military units
- BMW 303, a small family saloon
