= Exercise Frisian Flag =

Leeuwarden Air Base
- IATA: LWR; ICAO: EHLW

Summary
- Airport type: Military
- Owner: Military of the Netherlands
- Operator: Royal Netherlands Air Force (RNLAF); Koninklijke Luchtmacht (KLu)
- Location: Leeuwarden, Netherlands
- Built: 1938
- Elevation AMSL: 1 m / 3 ft
- Coordinates: 53°13′43″N 05°45′38″E

Map
- Location of Leeuwarden Air Base

Runways
Direction	Length		Surface
Direction	m	ft	Surface
05/23	2,957	9,701	Asphalt
02/20	1,999	6,559	Asphalt
- Source: DAFIF

Exercise Frisian Flag Is a major NATO multinational aerial exercise, held annually at Leeuwarden Air Base, Netherlands, over the North Sea and in the skies above the Netherlands, Germany and Denmark.

Missions flown during Frisian Flag included defensive and offensive air missions, protection of friendly aircraft and Close Air Support (CAS) strikes. Some missions call for Forward Air Controller units coordinate with fighter elements to attack ground targets. Surface-to-air missile systems enabled realistic exercise scenarios missions.

A combat search and rescue element has been added to recent Frisian Flag exercises. Usually involving the rescue of downed air crew by ground forces with the assistance of fighters and helicopters.

== History ==
The exercise was first held in 1992 following NATO intervention in Bosnia and Herzegovina, originally called exercise DIATIT, the first three letters coming from the word DIANA, 323 Tactical Training Evaluation and Standardization (TACTES) Squadron's nickname (the organizing unit) and the last three letters coming from the words Tactical Integrated Training. It changed its name to 'Frisian Flag' in 1999. The name 'Frisian Flag' was chosen because 'Frisian' is named after the province of Friesland, the home of Leeuwarden Air Base and because of similar 'Flag' exercises such as 'Red Flag' (U.S) and 'Maple Flag' (Canada).

Operational planning of Exercise Frisian Flag is organised by 322 Tactical Training Evaluation and Standardization (TACTES) Squadron of the Royal Netherlands Air Force (RNLAF).

Frisian Flag is open to North Atlantic Treaty Organization (NATO) and Partnership for Peace (PfP) members, participating aircraft fly twice-daily missions during the exercise, which is designed to prepare participating aircrew for complex hostile environments, including missions that may occur in a high intensity conflict. It provides the opportunity for air forces to plan and execute complex missions including offensive and defensive training in a realistic scenario. Defensive Counter Air (DCA) missions are flown with close coordination with ground-based surface-to-air missile units.

== Modern Era ==
The aerial exercises takes place in two waves daily, morning and afternoon during the two-week period. There is no flying in the evenings and on weekends.

During the exercise, the pilots co-operate with the land and naval forces, including the JTACs (Joint Terminal Attack Controllers). The fighter component will also receive support from a NATO AWACS platform. The European Air Refuelling Training (EART) exercise is integrated with Exercise Frisian Flag. French, Dutch, Italian and German tankers operate from Eindhoven air base.

Aircraft are divided into friendly 'Blue' and hostile 'Red' forces at the start of the exercise. Exercise Frisian Flag has evolved into one of the largest NATO exercises, involving more than 70 aircraft from NATO and Partnership for Peace countries.

During Frisian Flag command and control of aircraft is provided by Dutch and German Control and Reporting Centres (CRCs) supported by NATO AWACS (Airborne Warning and Control System) aircraft from NATO Air Base Geilenkirchen.

No live ammunition is used during the exercise. All air-to-air and air-to-ground weapon launches are simulated.

== Aggressors ==
Fighters from participating units, as well as Douglas A-4 Skyhawks from Discovery Air Defence play the role of 'Red' hostile forces. British company Cobham plc provide Falcon 20 aircraft to simulate enemy electronic jamming during Frisian Flag exercises. The Royal Norwegian Air Force has also provided electronic warfare Dassault Falcon 20 aircraft in previous Frisian Flag exercises.

A Gates Learjet 36A from Dutch company Skyline Aviation was used to provide hostile 'enemy' jamming during Frisian Flag 2013.

== Surface to Air Threat ==
Realistic ground based threats include surface-to-air missile (SAM) systems like the SA-6 'Gainful' and Roland mobile short-range SAM system and 'Smokey Sam' missiles that are fired at aircraft to simulate hostile enemy threat environment. Dutch Patriot SAM batteries have also been integrated into Frisian Flag. The SAM units are based at the Marnewaard training area and the Vliehors range (NATO codename 'Cornfield') on the Dutch island Vlieland.

== Gallery ==
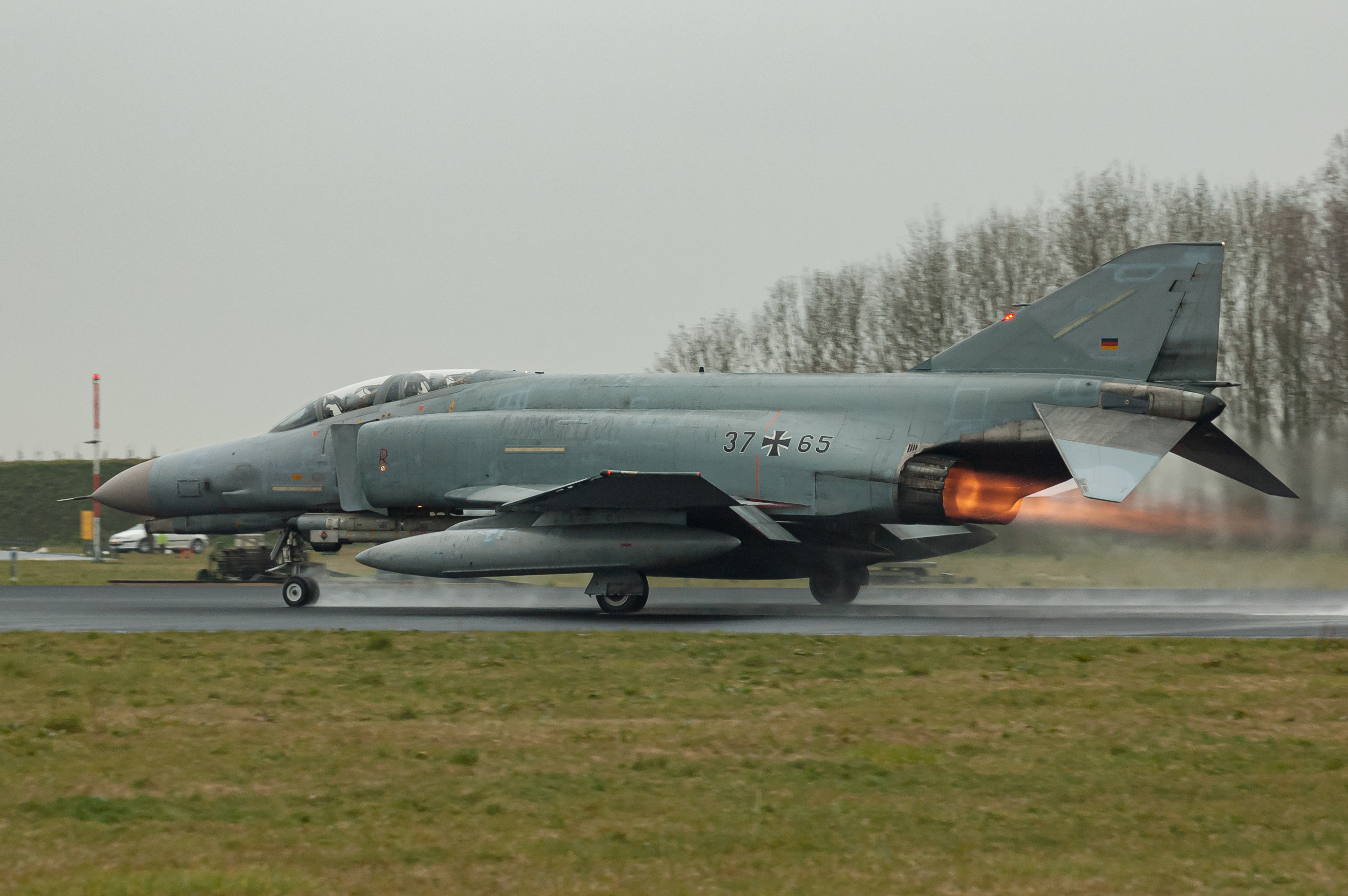
Luftwaffe F-4 Phantom II (Frisian Flag 2008)

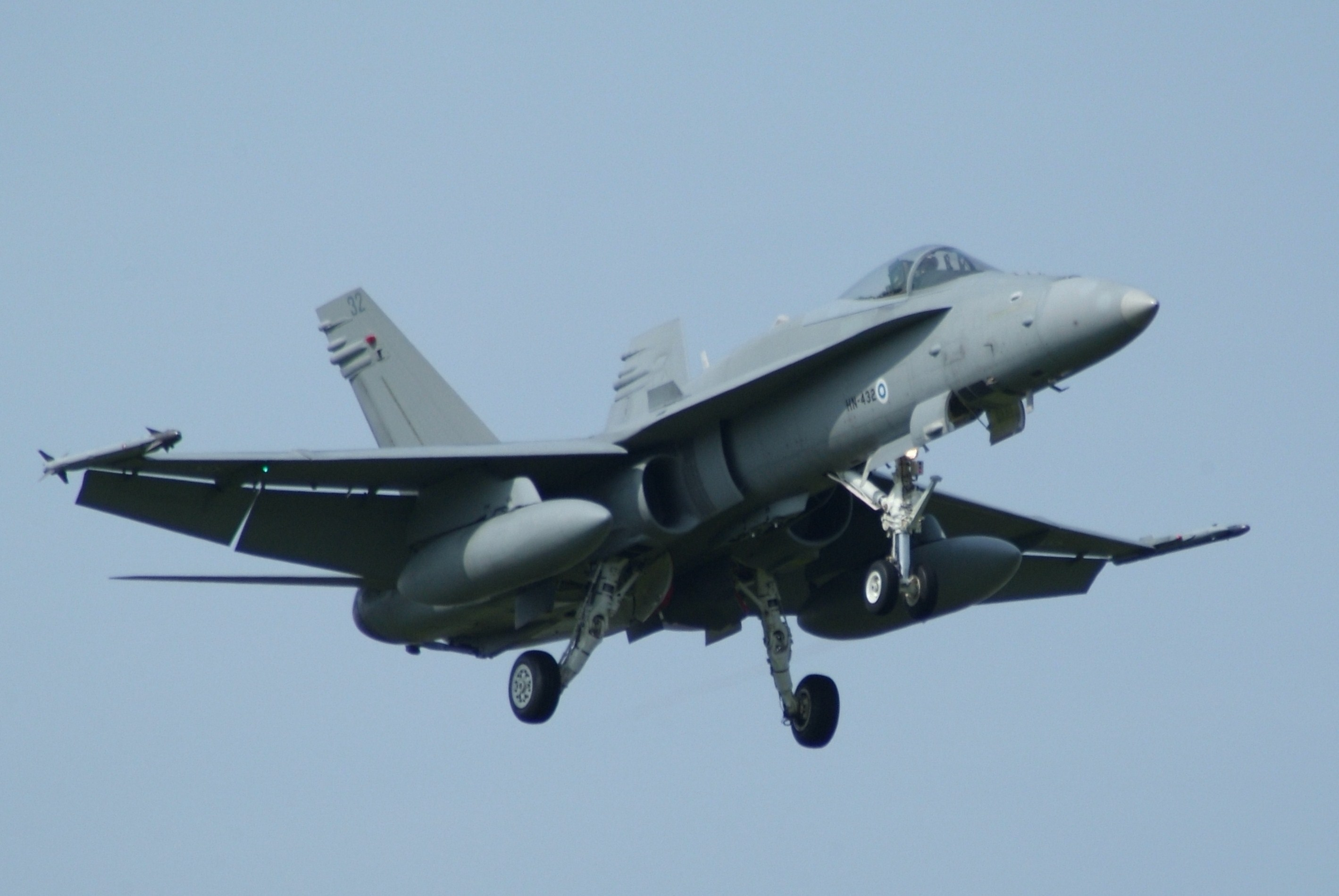
Finnish AF Boeing F-18C (Frisian Flag 2010)

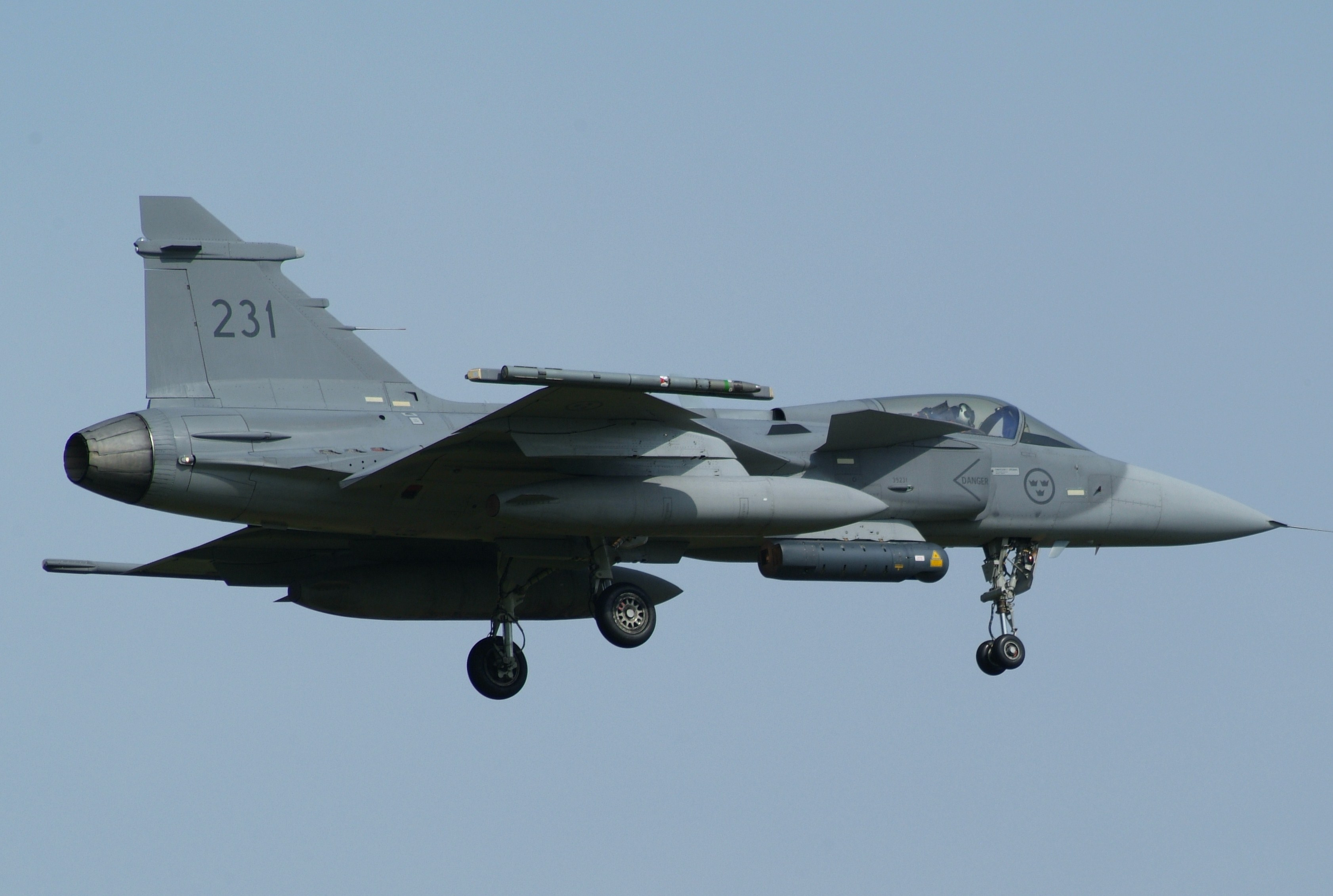
Swedish AF Saab JAS 39 Gripen (Frisian Flag 2010)

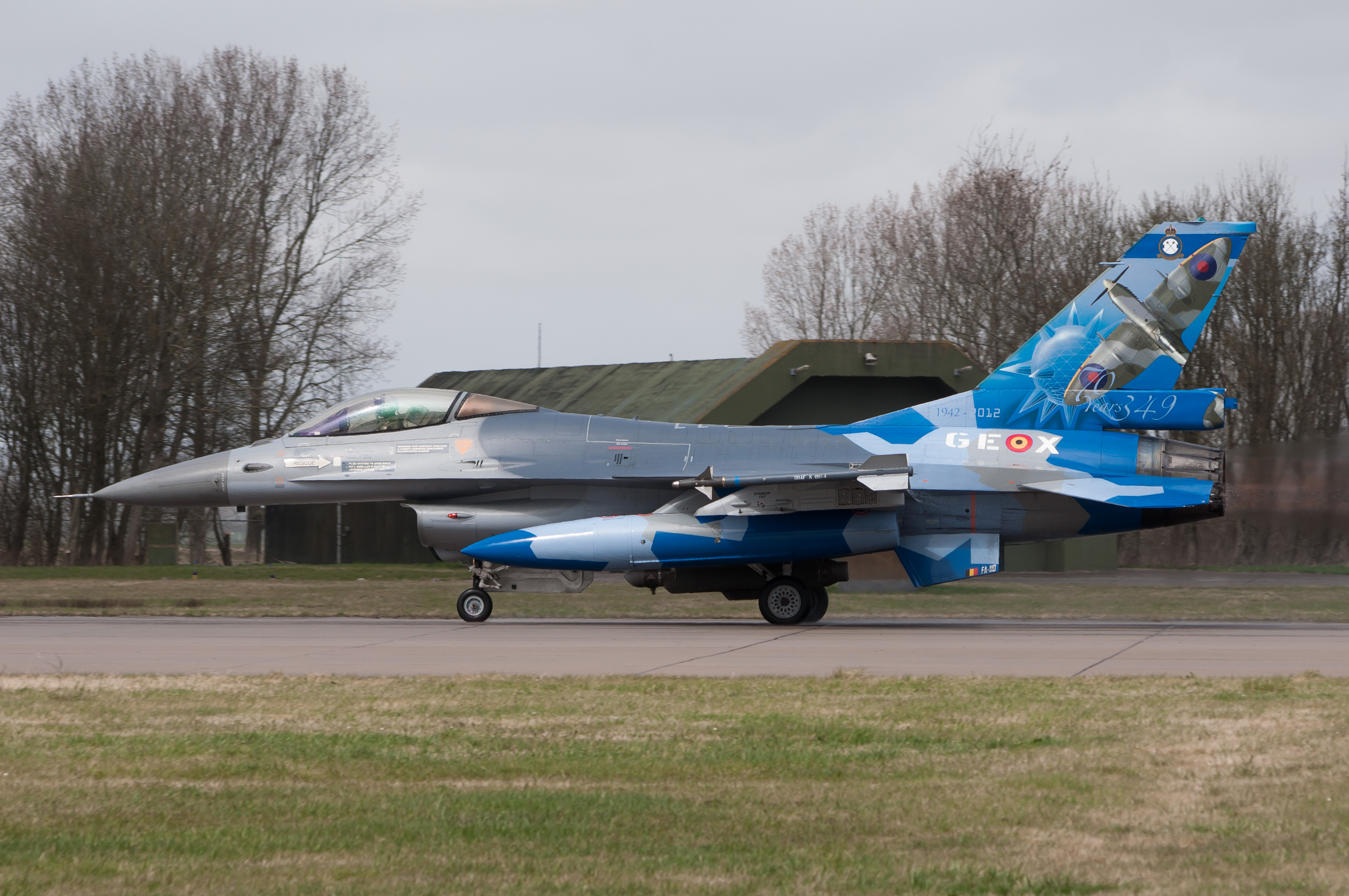
Belgian AF F-16AM (Frisian Flag 2013)

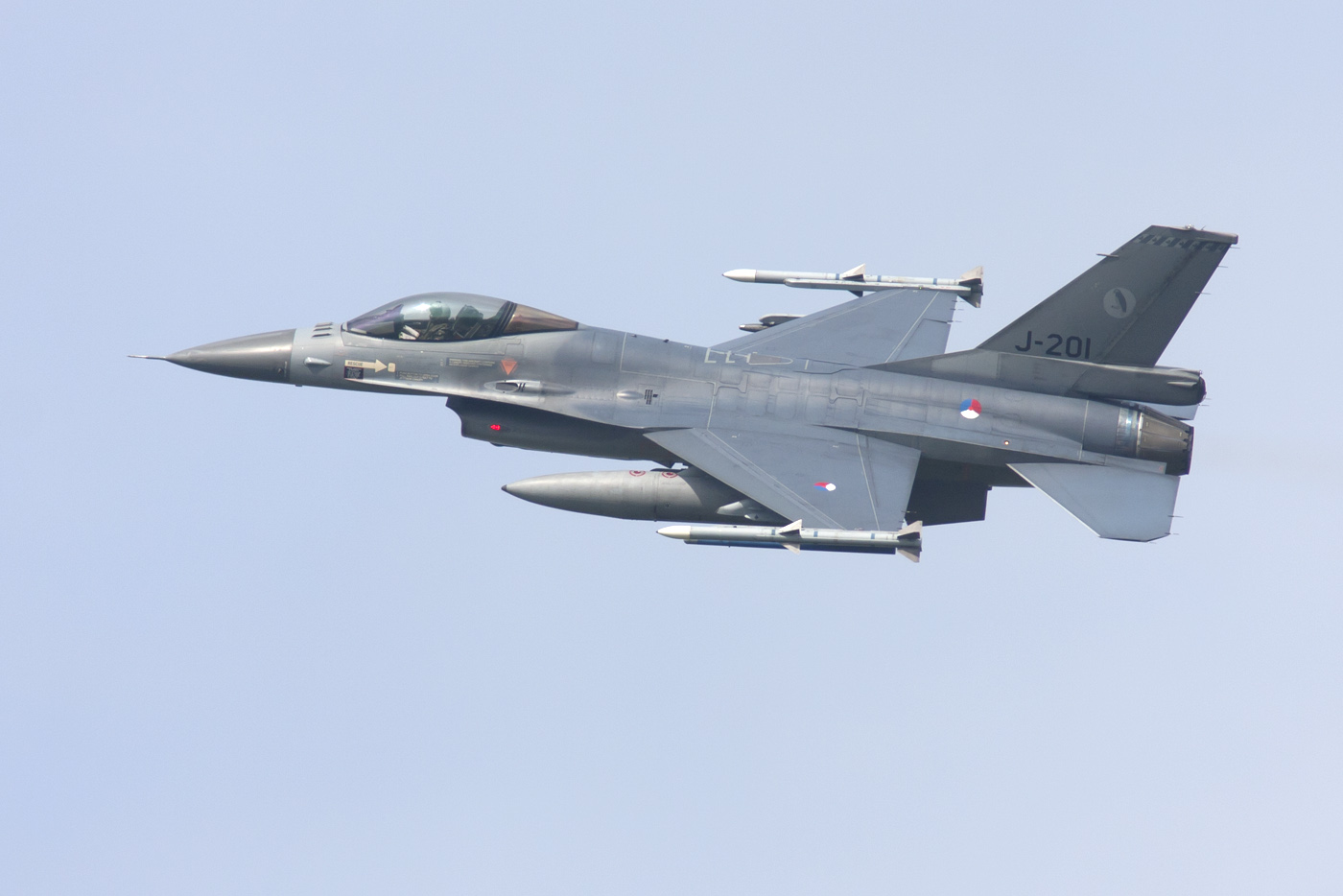
Royal Netherlands Air Force F-16MLU (Frisian Flag 2015)

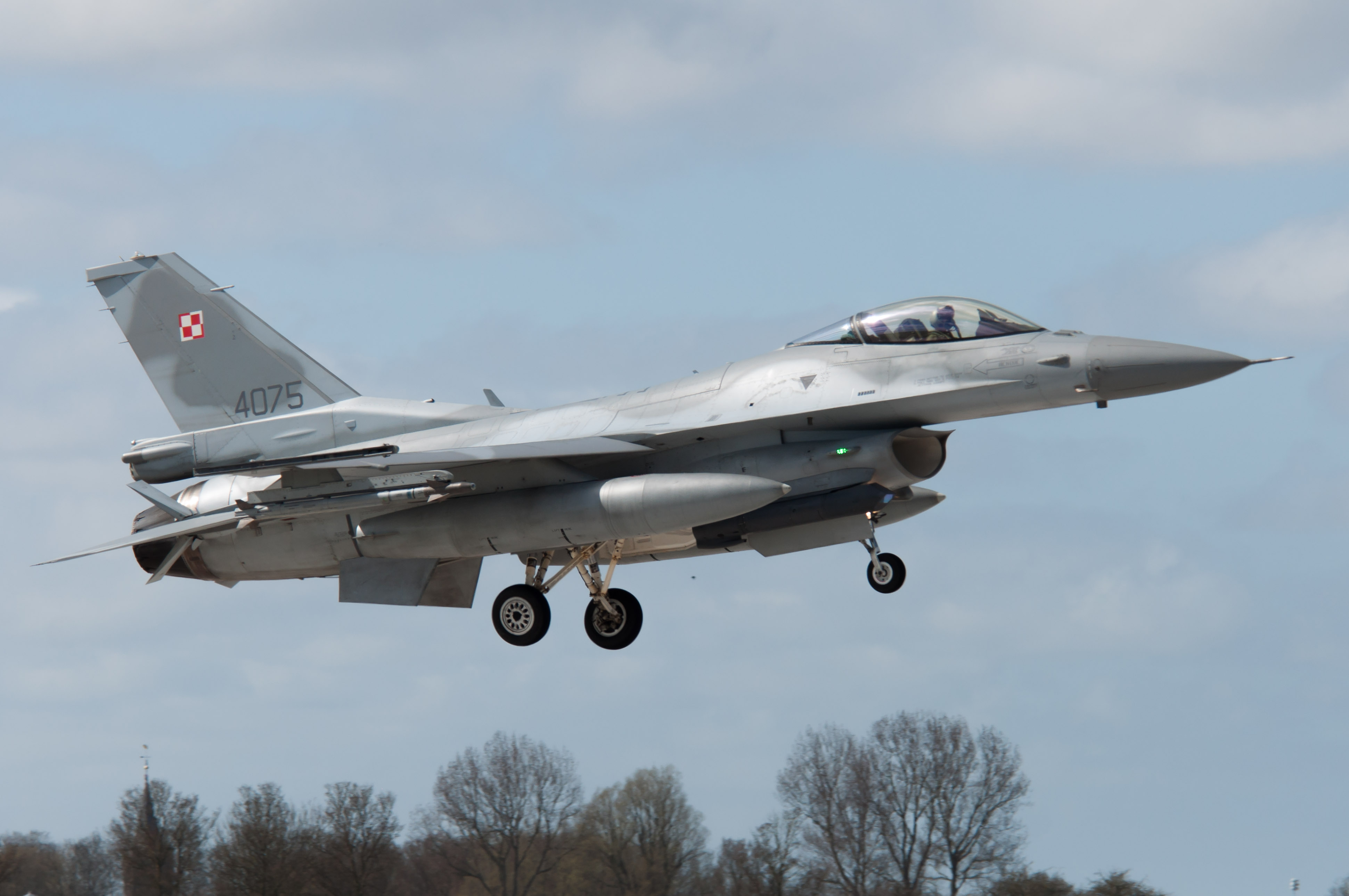
Polish Air Force F-16C (Frisian Flag 2015)

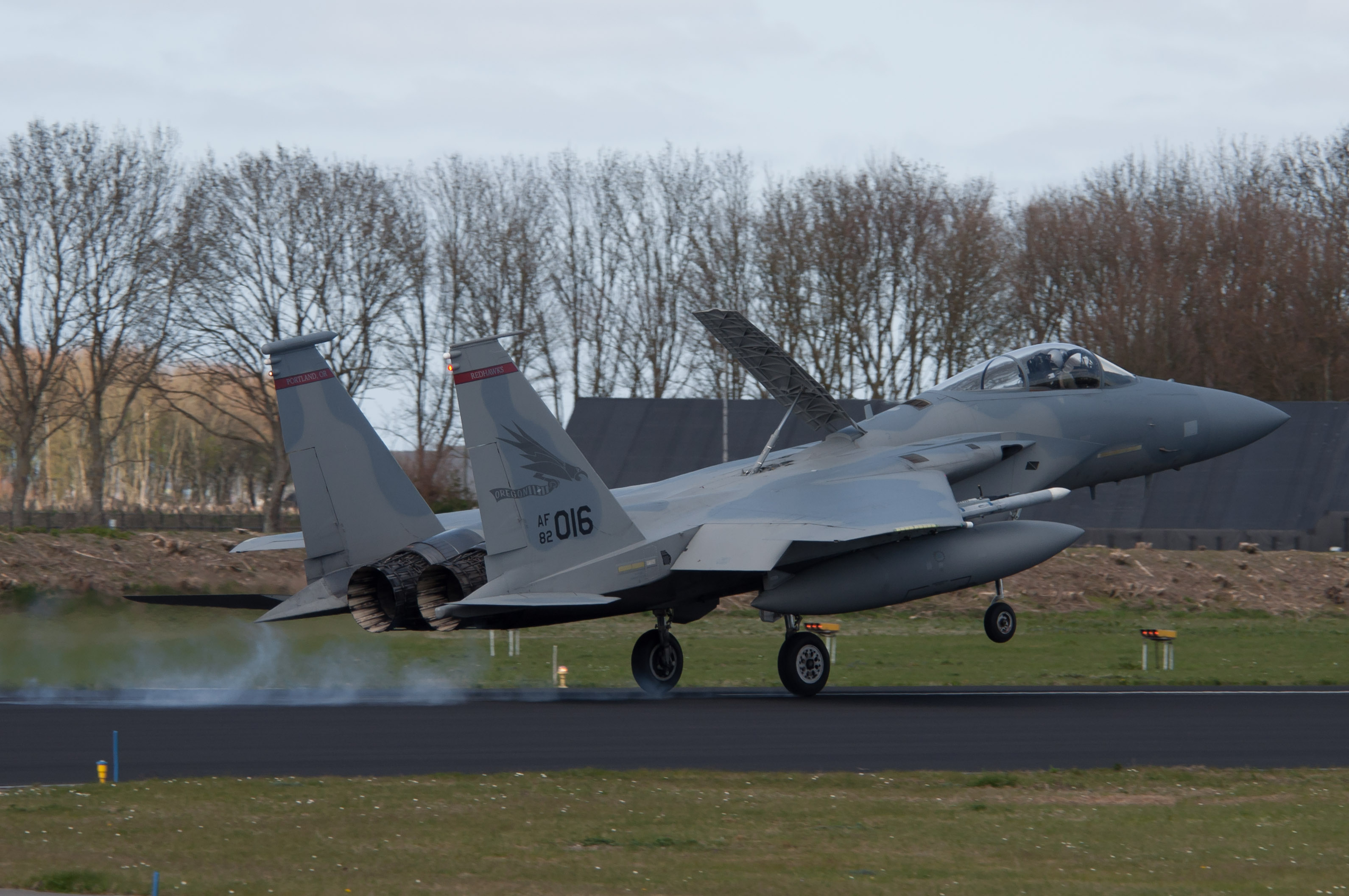
142nd FW Oregon ANG F-15C (Frisian Flag 2015)

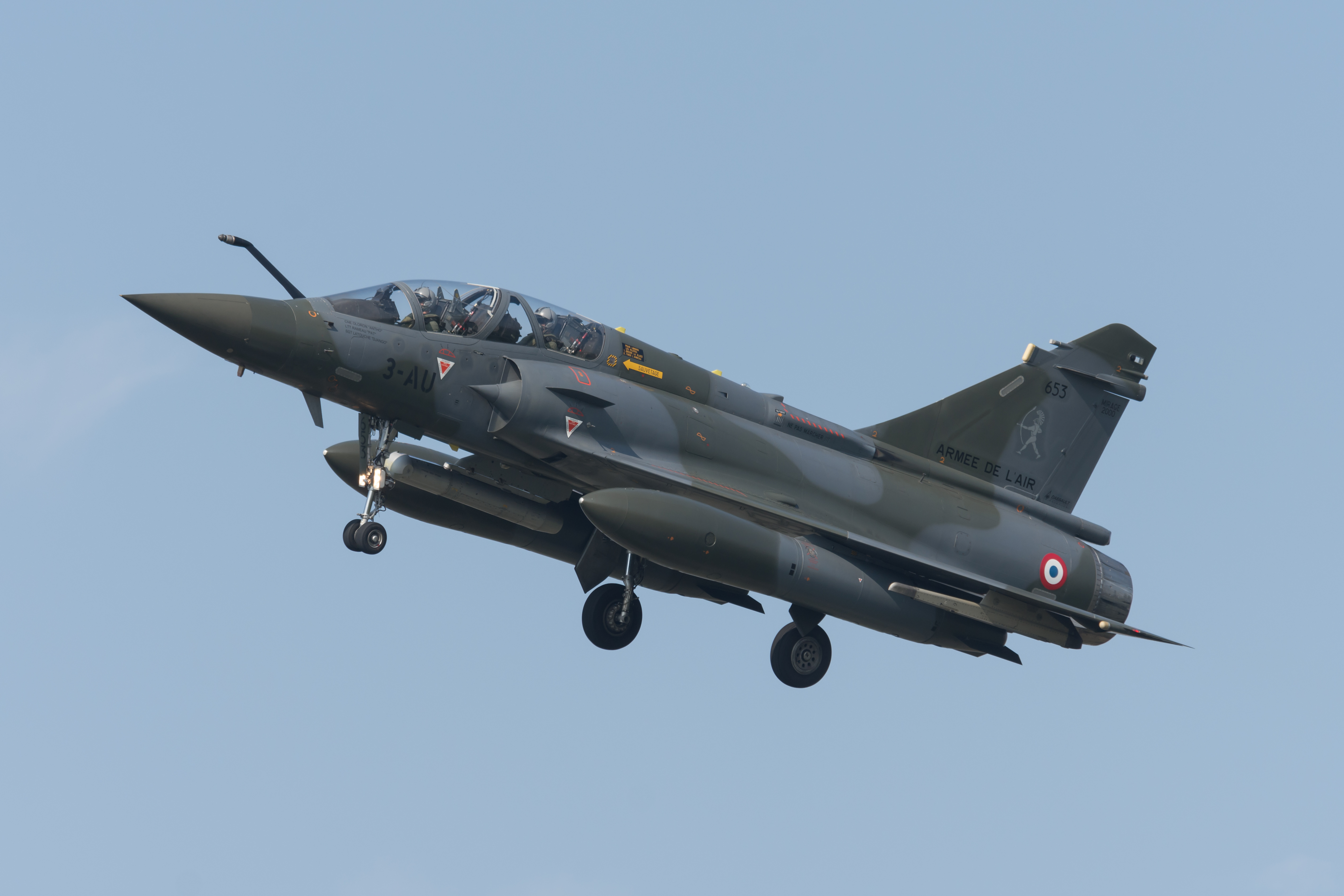
French AF Mirage 2000D (Frisian Flag 2017)

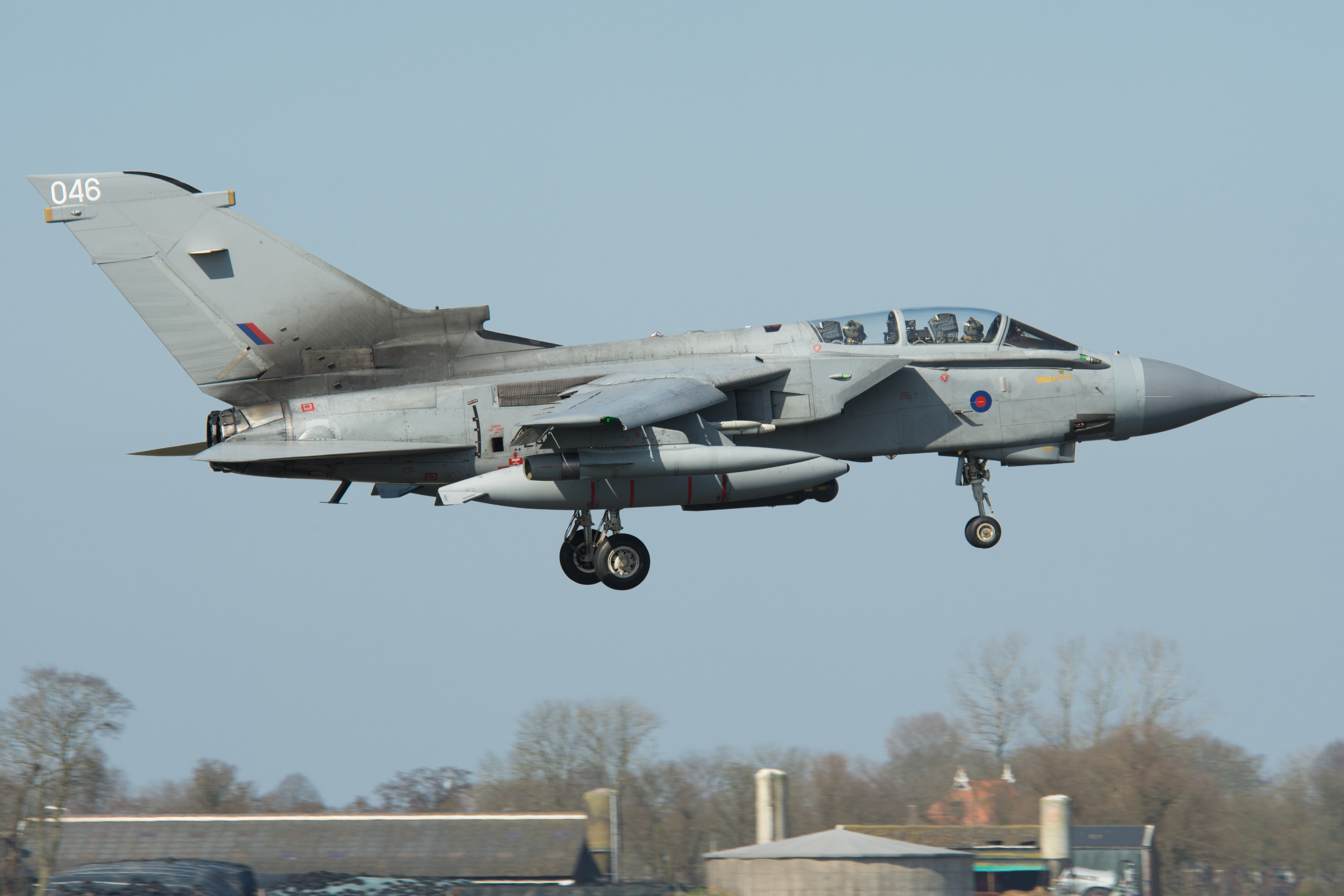
Royal Air Force Tornado GR4 (Frisian Flag 2017)

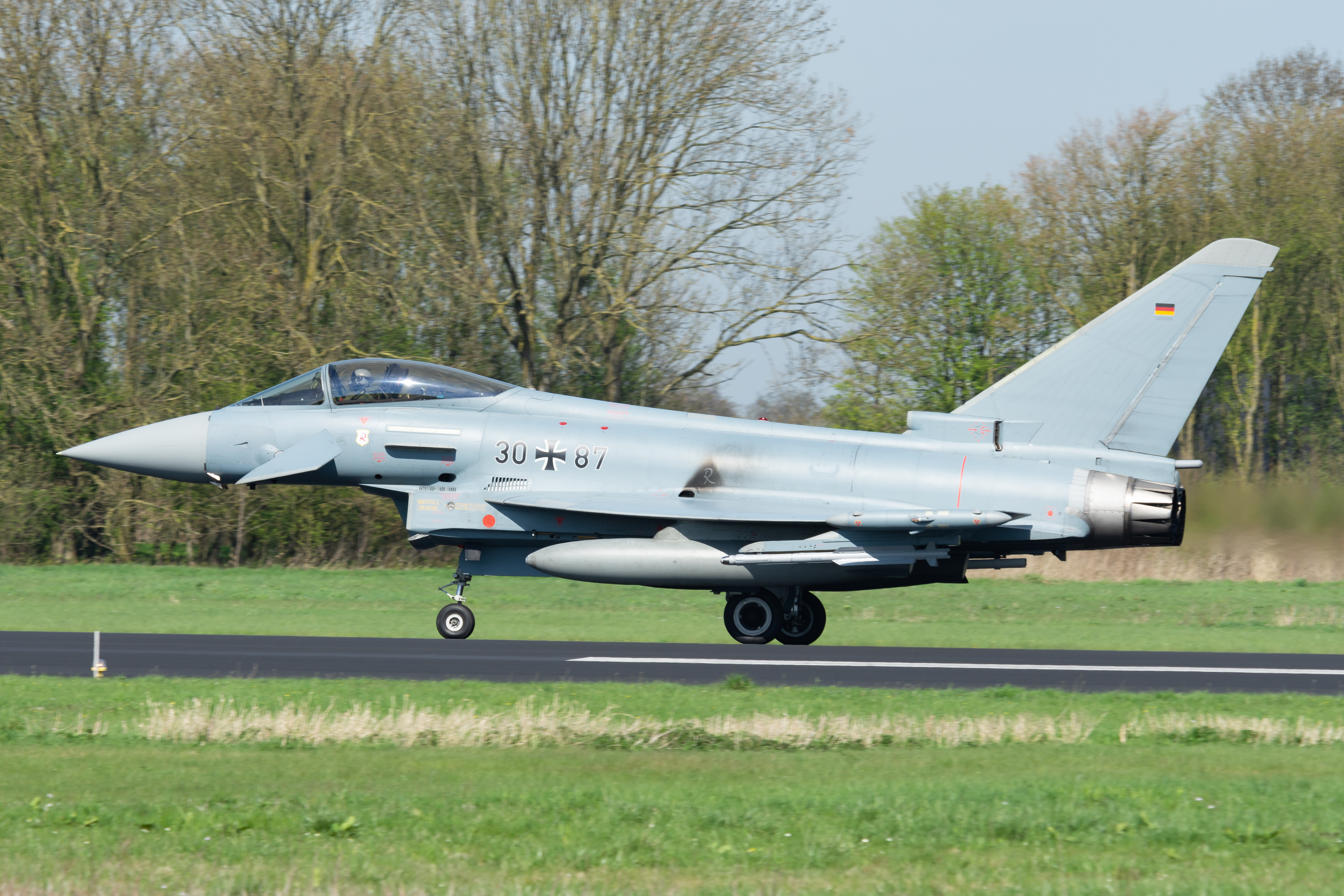
Luftwaffe Eurofighter (Frisian Flag 2018)

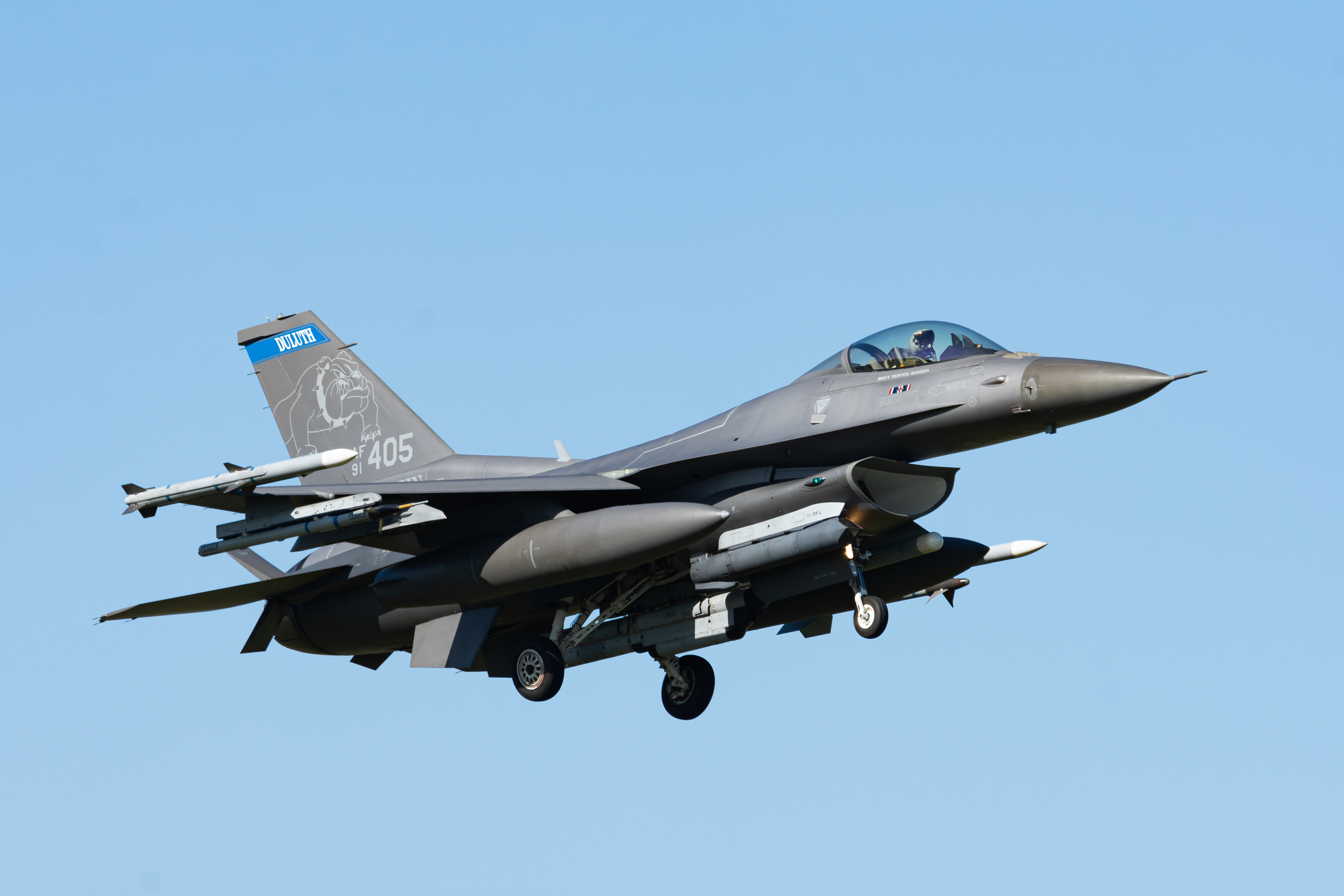
148th FW, Minnesota ANG, F-16C (Frisian Flag 2019)

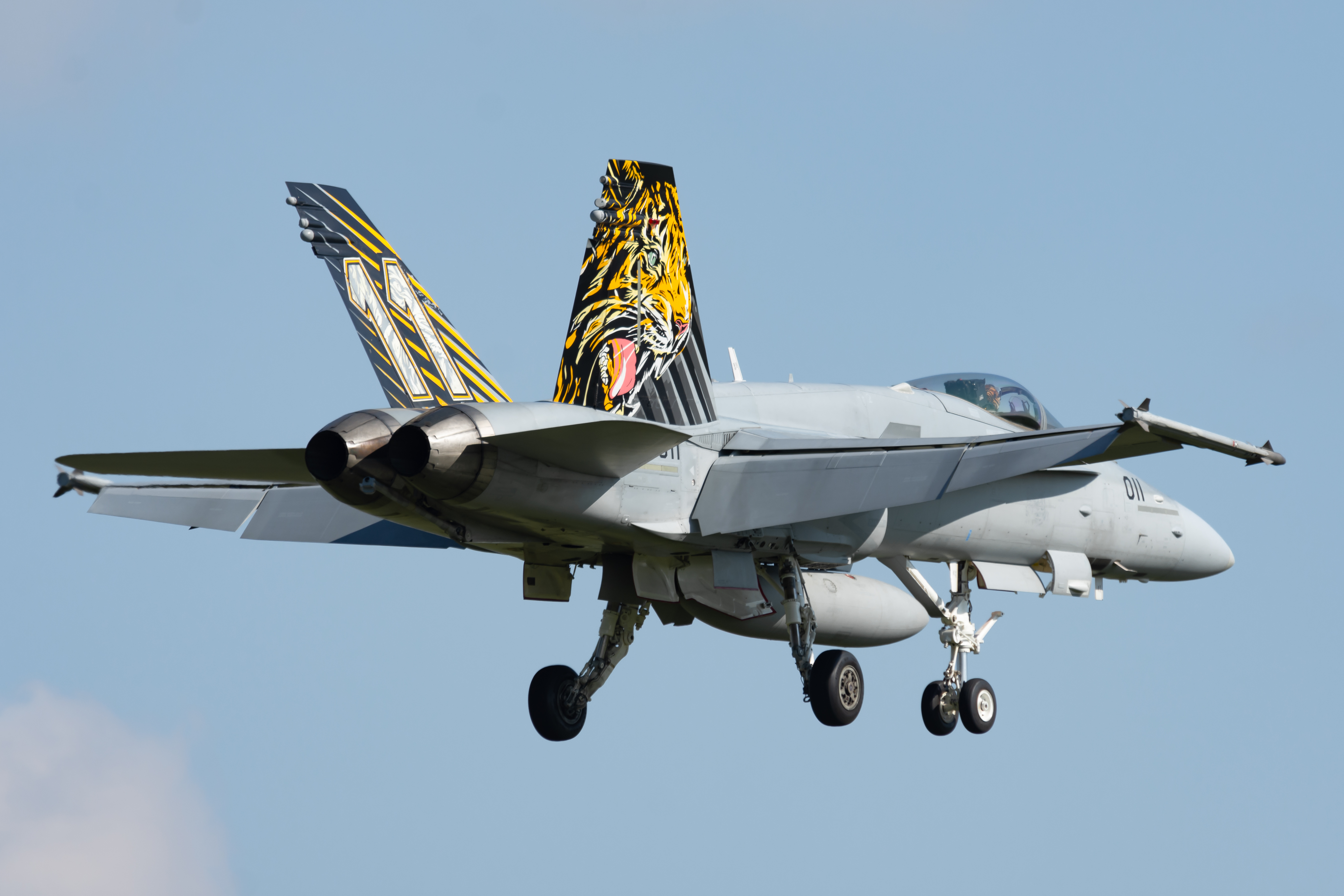
F/A-18C Swiss AF (Frisian Flag 2019)

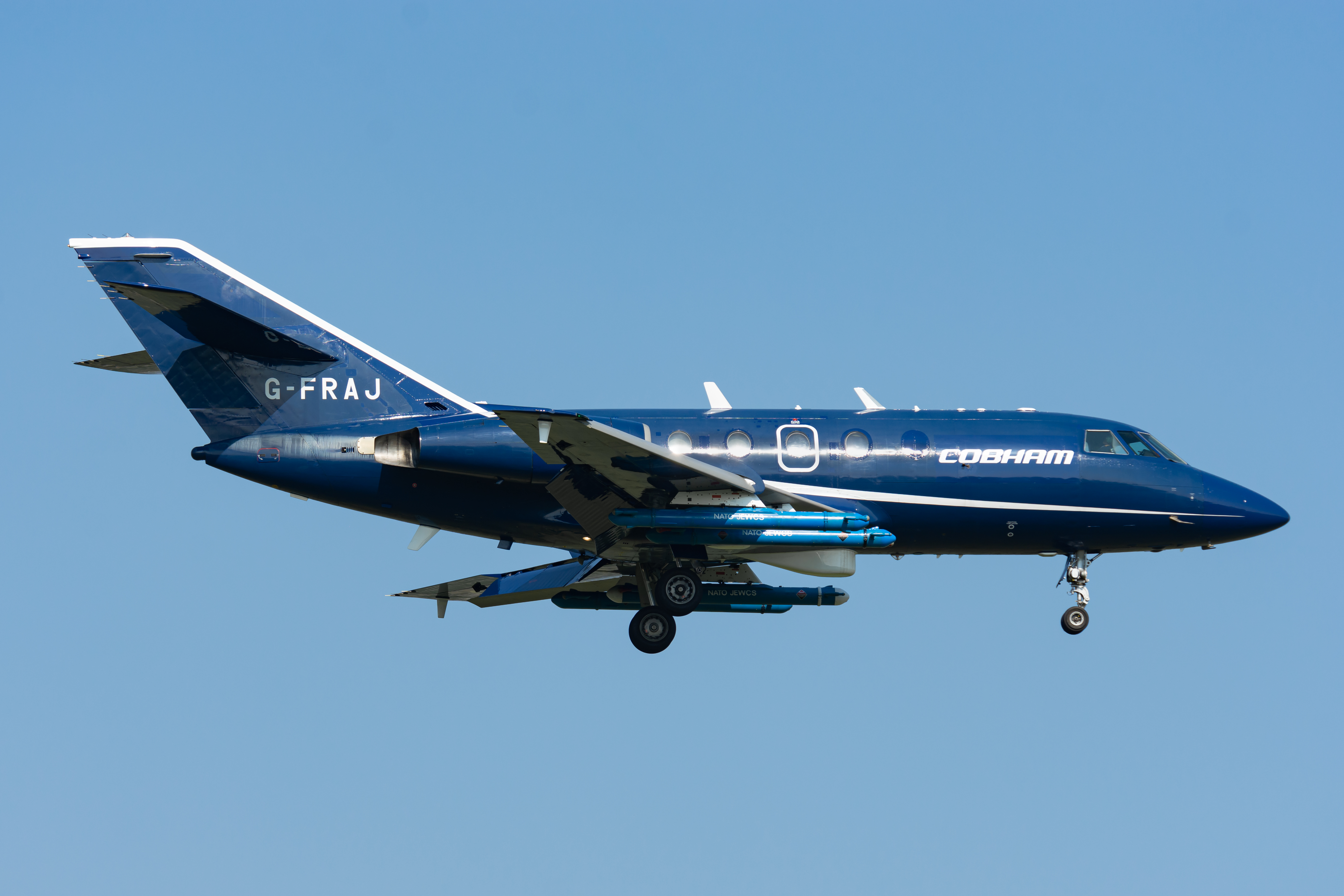
Dassault Falcon 20, Cobham PLC (U.K.) (Frisian Flag 2019)

== Past Participants ==
- Belgium
- Canada
- Denmark
- Finland
- France
- Germany
- Italy
- Netherlands
- Norway
- Poland
- Portugal
- Spain
- Sweden
- Switzerland
- United States
- United Kingdom
