= Leeuwarden Air Base =

Military airport in Friesland, Netherlands

Leeuwarden Air Base
- Vliegbasis Leeuwarden
- Leeuwarden, Friesland in Netherlands
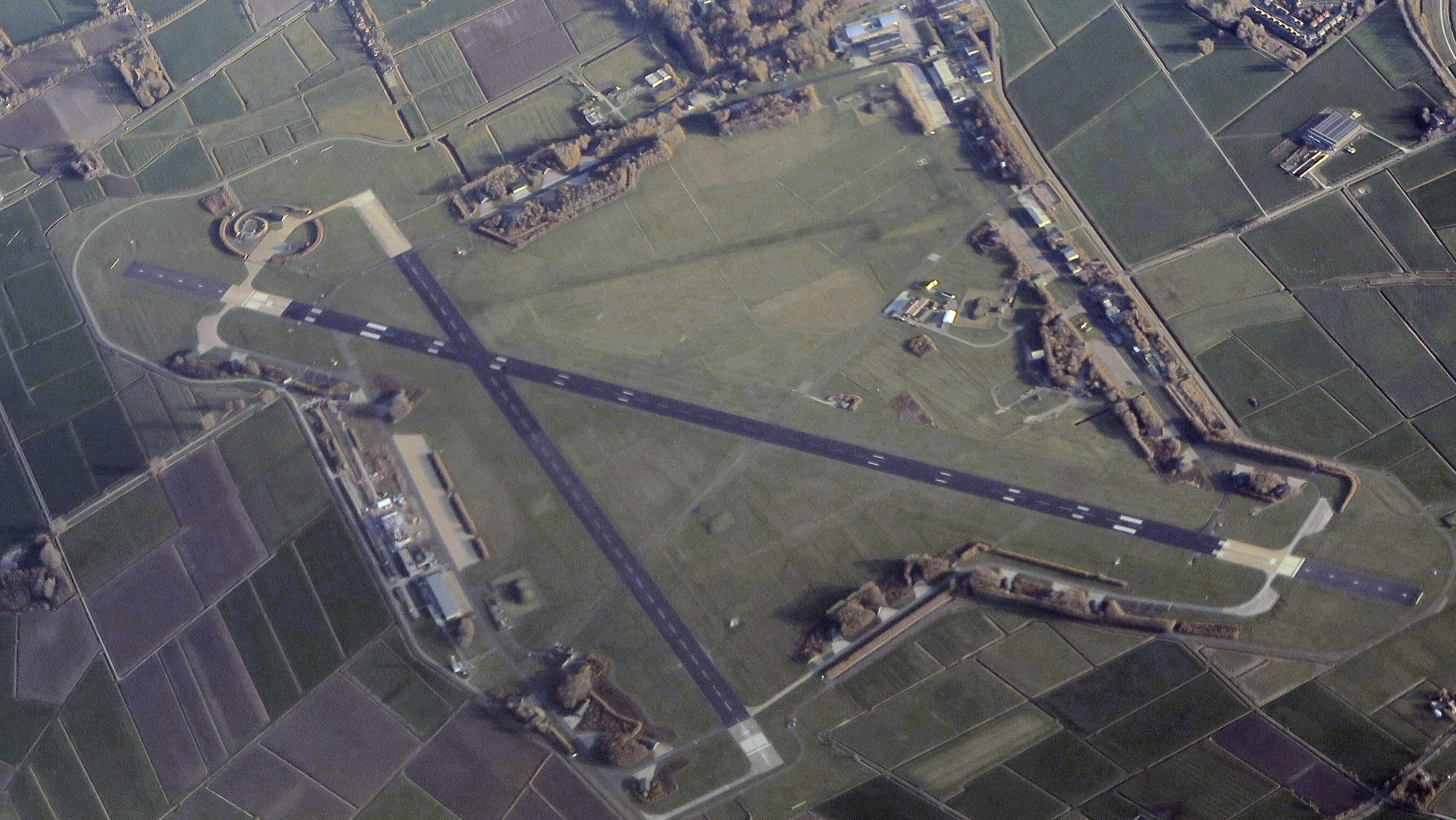
- An aerial view of Leeuwarden Air Base during 2018

- Motto Amicis inimicis promptus (Latin for 'Prompt friends become enemies')

Site information
- Type: Military airfield
- Owner: Ministry of Defence
- Operator: Royal Netherlands Air and Space Force (RNLASF)
- Condition: Operational

Location
- Location in the Netherlands
- Coordinates: 53°13′43″N 05°45′38″E

Site history
- Built: 1938 (as civil airport)
- In use: 1949 – present
- Events: Exercise Frisian Flag (annual)

Airfield information
- Identifiers: IATA: LWR, ICAO: EHLW, WMO: 062700
- Elevation: 0.91 metres (3 ft 0 in) AMSL
Runways
Direction	Length and surface
05/23	2,452.1 metres (8,045 ft) Asphalt
09/27	1,999.7 metres (6,561 ft) Asphalt
- Source: Military Aeronautical Information Publication Netherlands

Leeuwarden Air Base (Dutch: Vliegbasis Leeuwarden) is a military airbase used by the Royal Netherlands Air and Space Force (RNLASF) - Dutch: Koninklijke Luchtmacht (KLu), (IATA: LWR, ICAO: EHLW). The airbase was formerly one of the two F-16 Fighting Falcon bases of the RNLASF. The airbase lies northwest of the capital of Friesland, Leeuwarden.

Leeuwarden Air Base is also one of the three military airbases (together with Gilze-Rijen Air Base and Volkel Air Base) that used to organise the twice-in-three-years Luchtmachtdagen ('Air Force Days') of the Royal Netherlands Air Force, consisting of air shows and static exhibits. In 2006, 2008, 2011 and 2016 Leeuwarden Air Base hosted these public demonstration days.

Since Covid, the Luchtmachtdagen have not been held, and the demonstration flights of the F-16 and AH-64 Apache have also been halted.

== History ==
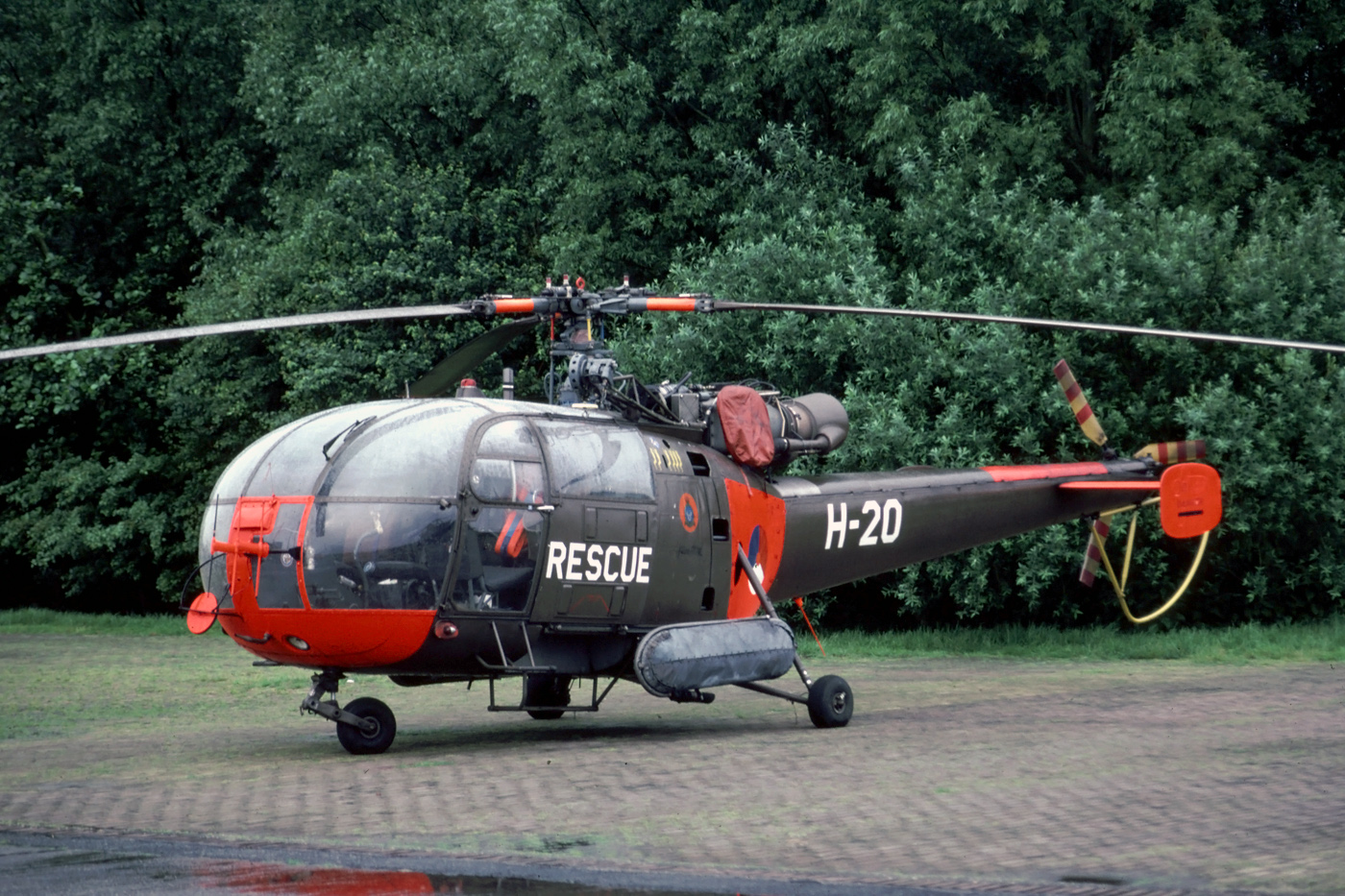
Sud-Aviation SE3160 Alouette III. These were used in the Search and Rescue (SAR) role at Leeuwarden until 1994. The aircraft is preserved at Soesterberg AF Museum.

The airport of Leeuwarden was built in 1938, and was used as an airport between Schiphol and Eelde. The airport was used only infrequently at first, but that changed after the Germans invaded the Low Countries in 1940. The Luftwaffe used the airport as a base for their fighter aircraft (including the Messerschmitt Bf 109) and bombers. From the airbase the Germans could reach Great Britain. During World War II, and especially on the 16th and 17 September 1944, the airbase was heavily bombed by the Royal Air Force.

After the liberation of the Netherlands the airbase was repaired, and during the first post-war years it was used as a civil airport, and KLM ran a commercial line to Schiphol. In 1949, Leeuwarden became a dedicated military airbase.

Two F-16 squadrons were based at Leeuwarden Air Base: the "swing-role" 322 Squadron RNLAF and the Tactical Training Evaluation and Standardisation (TACTES) 323 Squadron RNLAF. 323 Squadron stood down as an F-16 Squadron on 31 October 2014 (passing the TACTES task to 322 Squadron on the same day) before being reinstated as the F-35A Test Squadron on 5 November 2014 at Eglin Air Force Base.

In addition, Leeuwarden Air Base was the home base of 303 Squadron RNLAF (Search and Rescue), part of the newly formed Defence Helicopter Command (DHC). It employed three Agusta Bell AB 412SP helicopters before its stand-down on 1 January 2015.

== Role and operations ==
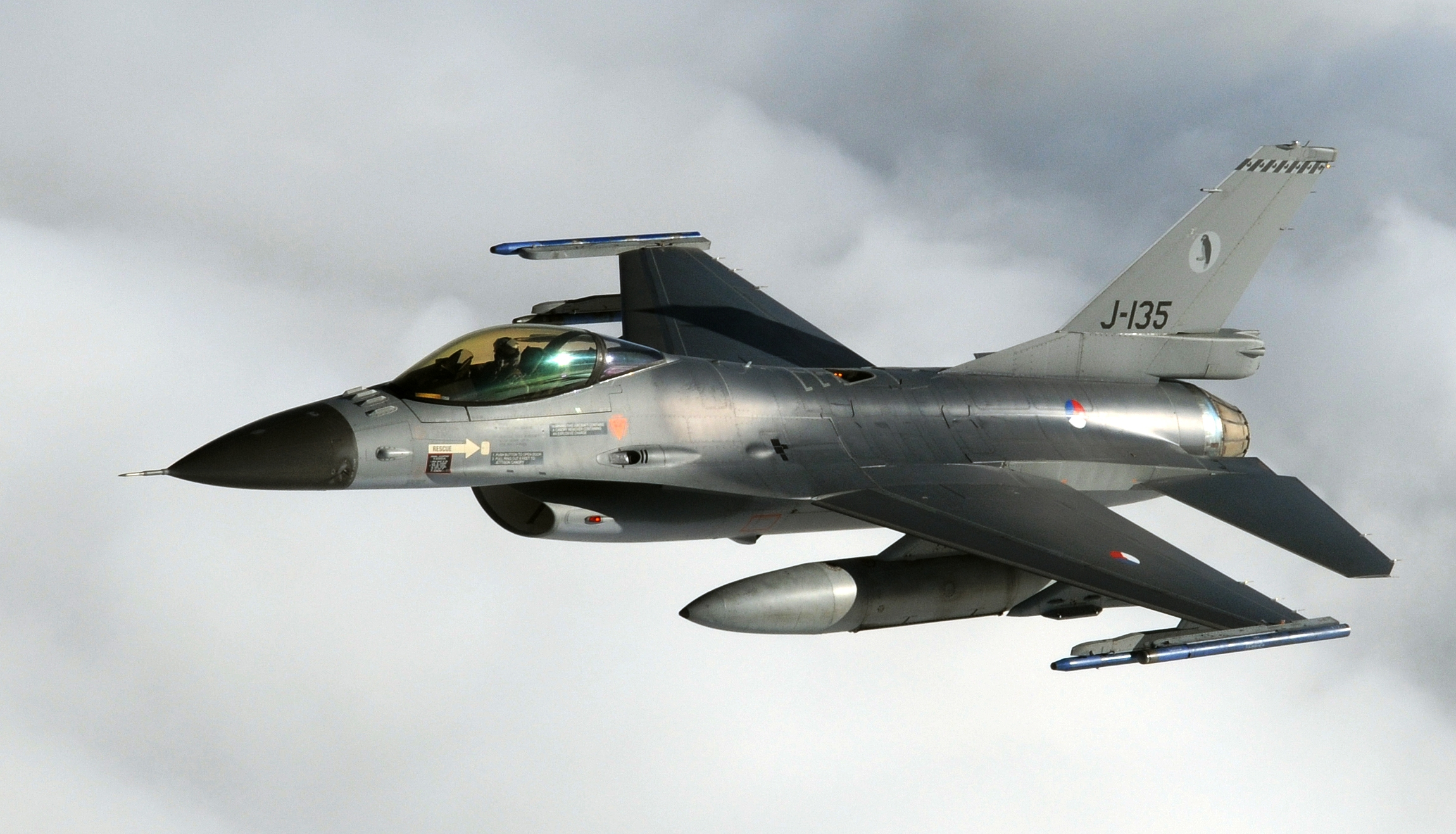
A Royal Netherlands Air Force F-16 "J-135". Note the depiction of the Frisian flag and the 322 Squadron mascot Polley Grey on the tail.

Leeuwarden Air Base was one of two Royal Netherlands Air Force F-16AM Fighting Falcon bases, which are being replaced by F-35A Lightning II, the first of which arrived at Leeuwarden on 31 October 2019.

The base is the location of the Fighter Weapons Instructor Training (FWIT) and the annual multinational NATO exercise "Frisian Flag". On 31 March 2015 six F-15Cs from the 125th Fighter Wing of the Florida Air National Guard landed at Leeuwarden Air Base to take part in Frisian Flag 2015.

Four MQ-9 Reapers with a Ground Station will be fully air-deployable and self-supporting for global operations will be based at Leeuwarden from 2020. Future use by public services related to homeland security and surveillance (including the National Police; and customs, naval and environmental surveillance) is also planned.

== Based units ==
Units based at Leeuwarden.

=== Royal Netherlands Air and Space Force ===
- No. 306 Squadron – MQ-9A Reaper
- No. 322 Squadron – F-35A Lightning II
- No. 323 Squadron - Air Combat Development Centre
- No. 920 Squadron – Maintenance
- No. 921 Squadron – Logistics
- No. 922 Squadron – Base operations

== See also ==
- Netherlands in World War II
