= 303 Squadron =

303 Squadron or 303rd Squadron may refer to:

- No. 303 Squadron RAF, a Polish squadron during the Second World War
  - Squadron 303 (book)
  - Hurricane: 303 Squadron, a 2018 film
  - 303 Squadron (film), a 2018 film
- No. 303 Squadron RNLAF, a search and rescue unit of the Royal Netherlands Air Force 1959–2015
- 303rd Aero Squadron, an American aero squadron, 1918
- 303d Fighter Squadron (World War II), United States Army Air Forces, later 139th Airlift Squadron
- 303rd Fighter Squadron, a World War II United States Army Air Forces unit formed as 303d Troop Carrier Squadron
- 303rd Intelligence Squadron, United States Air Force
- 303rd Expeditionary Rescue Squadron, United States Air Force
