= Out There =

Out There may refer to:

== Music ==
- Out There (tour), a 2013–2015 concert tour by Paul McCartney

=== Albums ===
- Out There (Betty Carter album), 1958
- Out There (Eleanor McEvoy album), 2006
- Out There (Eric Dolphy album) or the title song, 1961
- Out There (Jimmie Vaughan album), 1998
- Out There (Love album), 1988
- Out There (The Original Sins album), 1992
- Out There (Rick Wakeman album) or the title song, 2003
- Out There Live, by Dar Williams, 2001

=== Songs ===
- "Out There" (Dinosaur Jr. song), 1993
- "Out There" (Disney song), from the soundtrack to the film The Hunchback of Notre Dame, 1996
- "Out There", by Evelyn "Champagne" King from Music Box, 1979
- "Out There", by Sia, Chris Braide, and Hans Zimmer from the British documentary TV series Seven Worlds, One Planet, 2019

== Television ==
- Out There (1951 TV series), a 1951–1952 American science fiction series
- Out There (1985 TV series), an Australian magazine style television program for teenagers
- Out There (2003 TV series), a 2003–2004 American/Australian drama series
- Out There (2013 TV series), an American adult animated series
- Out There (2025 TV series), a British drama series
- Out There (comedy specials), a 1993–1994 pair of American LGBT comedy specials
- Out There with Melissa DiMarco, a Canadian sitcom that premiered in 2004
- Stephen Fry: Out There, a 2013 two-part British documentary series
- OutTHERE, a 2001–2003 British film and television review show

== Other uses ==
- OutThere, a LGBTQ luxury travel magazine
- Out There (video game), a 2014 Android and iOS game
- LindseyB Outthere, member of the American dance crew Beat Freaks

== See also ==
- Out of There, a sculpture by Clement Meadmore
- Out Here (disambiguation)
