= No. 303 Squadron RNLAF =

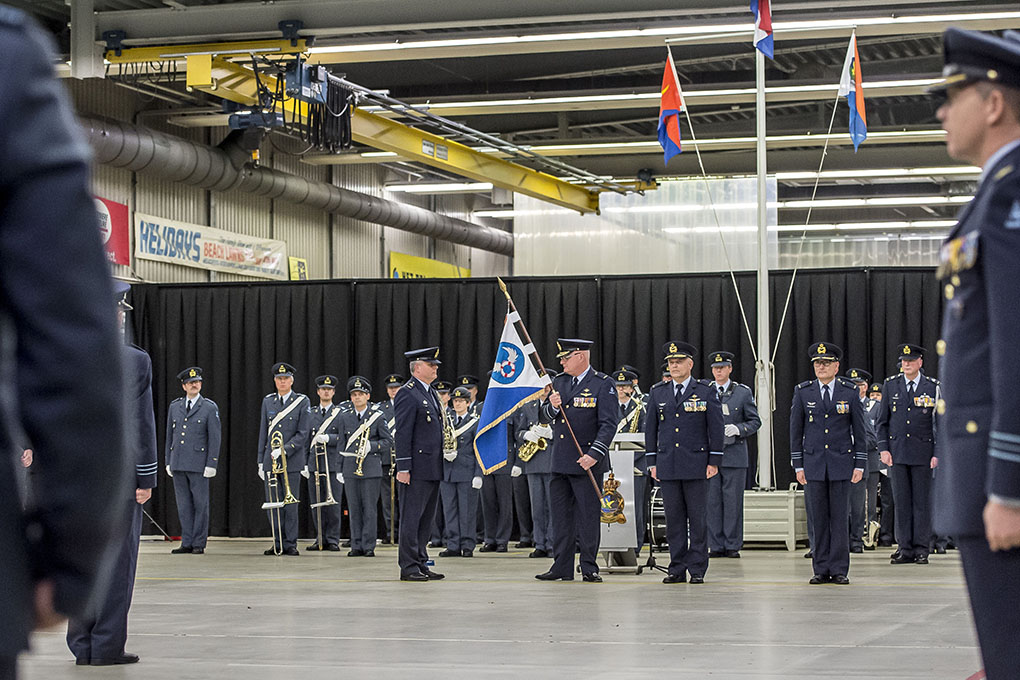
303 Search and Rescue Squadron members at its disbandment in 2015

303 Search and Rescue (SAR) Squadron was a search and rescue unit of the Royal Netherlands Air Force. Since its inception in 1959, it carried more than 4,100 emergency and life-saving flights.

The Royal Netherlands Air Force decided in 1959 to create her own rescue unit. The unit is in this early period was 298 Squadron RNLAF, based at Ypenburg Air Base, near The Hague. With the commissioning of the first helicopter, the Alouette II, the squadron gets an extra task: Tactical Air Rescue. After the introduction of the larger and faster Alouette III and the move to Soesterberg Air Base in 1968 this task ended and there were two new tasks: transporting members of the Royal Family and aerial photography.

Since the field is mainly located around military shooting ranges on Terschelling and Vlieland, they moved in 1977 to Leeuwarden Air Base.

The squadron reequipped with Agusta-Bell AB 412SPs in March 1994. On 15 June 2015, the squadron disbanded, with its search and rescue role being contracted to the Belgian civilian helicopter operator Noordzee Helikopters Vlaanderen (NHV).
