= Out of Here =

Out of Here may refer to:

- Out of Here (Departure Lounge album), 2000
- Out of Here (Corduroy album), 1994
- "Out of Here", a song on The Soup Dragons album Hydrophonic

== See also ==
- Outta Here, a 2009 album by Esmée Denters
- Outta Here (Esmée Denters song)
- Outta Here (Laura Tesoro song)
