= .303 (film) =

- Directed by: David Serge
- Written by: David Serge
- Produced by: Matthew Pullicino; David Serge
- Starring: Mark Mifsud
- Cinematography: David Serge
- Edited by: Daniel Lapira
- Release date: March 2009 (Palm Springs International Shortfest)
- Running time: 10 minutes
- Country: Malta
- Language: English

.303 is a 2009 short film directed by David Serge and produced by The Bigger Picture Malta.

The short film's title comes from the .303 British cartridge that was the United Kingdom's calibre until the 1950s. It was also what the British Lee-Enfield rifles were chambered for. A custom engraved .303 round is an important plot point in the film.

== Plot ==
In spring or summer of 1943, a plane full of allied soldiers from the United Kingdom comes to invade Axis-controlled Sicily, Italy. One of them, Private Atkins, is given a custom engraved .303 calibre cartridge by his friend, Private Mattocks, which is supposed to bring him luck. The brass casing seems to be engraved with the name "EMMA", who is, apparently, a sweetheart of Atkins or Mattocks. They parachute into the streets, which are deserted with the exception of a child and Nazi German soldiers. Atkins' parachute is tangled on a bridge and he is left dangling on the ground, with his No. 4 Mk. 1 SMLE rifle with extra magazines and clips of ammunition lying on the ground below. Atkins is able to cut himself free, but only has enough time to collect his rifle and hide before a vehicle filled with Nazi soldiers arrives. Seeing the remains of his parachute and sensing that he is still around, they seize his ammunition and split up to go find Atkins. Terrified and confused, Atkins explores the town square and finds the corpse of another British soldier on a staircase, taking a few clips of .303-calibre ammunition for his own rifle. However, before he can grab more, he is surprised by a German soldier with a Mauser Kar 98k. The two soldiers have a brief but intense shootout that ends with Atkins running out of ammunition. However, he remembers the engraved .303 round given to him by Private Mattocks, his good luck charm. Atkins loads the cartridge into his rifle and aims at the landing, as soon as he sees movement, shoots and kills the other soldier. He goes over to the landing and finds that his friend Private Mattocks had really shot the German, and that he had just shot his friend with the very round that was supposed to bring him luck. Private Mattocks dies in agony from a gunshot wound to his throat as a heartbroken Atkins watches and attempts to stop the bleeding. He takes off his helmet to mourn his dead friend, unsure of what to do next. While he is doing this, another German soldier comes up from behind him and shoots him in the back repeatedly with an MP40 submachine gun. The same Sicilian boy seen at the beginning of the short film witnesses the act, and the German soldier gives him a chocolate bar.

== Accolades ==
It has won the award for Best Overall Production, Best Cinematography and the Local Jury Award at the Malta International TV Short Film Festival. It also made the Official Selection at the Palm Springs International Short Fest, California as well as the Bodega Bay International Film Festival.
