= Royal Netherlands Air and Space Force =

Air warfare branch of the Netherlands' armed forces

- Koninklijke Luchtmacht
- Badge of the Royal Netherlands Air Force
- Founded: 27 March 1953; 73 years ago (Note: Its ancestor, the Luchtvaartafdeling (aviation department) of the Dutch Army was founded with four pilots on 1 July 1913.)
- Country: Netherlands
- Type: Air force Space force
- Role: Aerial warfare Space warfare
- Size: 9,467 personnel (2025): 7,051 active military personnel; 1,349 civilian personnel; 1,067 reservists
- Part of: Netherlands Armed Forces
- Mottos: Latin: Parvus numero, magnus merito; "Small in numbers, great in deeds"
- March: Parade March of the Royal Netherlands Air Force
- Website: defensie.nl

Commanders
- Commander: Lieutenant-general André Steur
- Deputy Commander: Robert Adang

Insignia
- Roundel

- Flag

- Logo

Aircraft flown
- Fighter: F-35A
- Attack helicopter: AH-64E
- Cargo helicopter: CH-47F
- Multirole helicopter: AS532 U2, NH90 NFH
- Reconnaissance: MQ-9 Block 5
- Trainer: PC-7
- Transport: C-130H, G650ER
- Tanker: A330 MRTT

The Royal Netherlands Air and Space Force (RNLASF) (Dutch: Koninklijke Luchtmacht, KLu, lit. 'Royal Air Force') is the air and space branch of the Netherlands Armed Forces. The Royal Netherlands Air Force was created in 1953 to succeed its predecessor, the Luchtvaartafdeeling (lit. 'Aviation Department') of the Royal Netherlands Army, which was founded in 1913. In 2025 the Royal Netherlands Air Force was renamed the Royal Netherlands Air and Space Force. The aerobatic display team of the Royal Netherlands Air Force, active from 1979 until 2019, was the Solo Display Team.

== History ==
The Royal Netherlands Air Force was preceded by the Army Aviation Group (Luchtvaartafdeling, abbreviation LVA), founded in 1913. It was renamed as Army Aviation Brigade (Luchtvaartbrigade) in 1939. In 1953, it was raised to the level of independent operational part of the Dutch Armed Forces and renamed as Royal Netherlands Air Force (Koninklijke Luchtmacht).

On 1 July 2025 the Royal Netherlands Air Force was renamed to the Royal Netherlands Air and Space Force.

=== Army Aviation Group ===
Dutch air power started on 1 July 1913, with the founding of the Army Aviation Group at Soesterberg airfield (vliegbasis Soesterberg) having four pilots. When founded, the Army Aviation Group operated one aircraft, the Brik, which was supplemented with three French Farman HF.20 aircraft a few months later. These aircraft were soon outdated, and the Dutch government ordered several fighter/reconnaissance Nieuport and Caudron aircraft to replace them.

==== World War I (1914–1918) ====
The Netherlands maintained a neutral position during World War I and the Army Aviation Group did not take part in any action. Instead, they focused on developing the force's capabilities.

Pilot training was opened and established for ranks including officers in technical, aerial photography, meteorological and navigation flights.

New airfields were built at Arnhem, Gilze-Rijen Air Base, Venlo and Vlissingen.

Because of the war, it was difficult to procure suitable aircraft. In 1917, the situation changed and their personnel increased to 650.

==== Interbellum ====
After the end of World War I the Dutch government cut the defence budget and the Army Aviation Group was almost dissolved. As political tensions in Europe increased during the late 1930s the government tried to rebuild the armed forces again in 1938 but there were many problems, not least the shortage of pilot instructors, navigators and pilots to fly the new multiple engine aircraft. Lack of standardisation and resulting maintenance issues added to the complexity of the rebuilding task.

=== Army Aviation Brigade ===
==== World War II ====
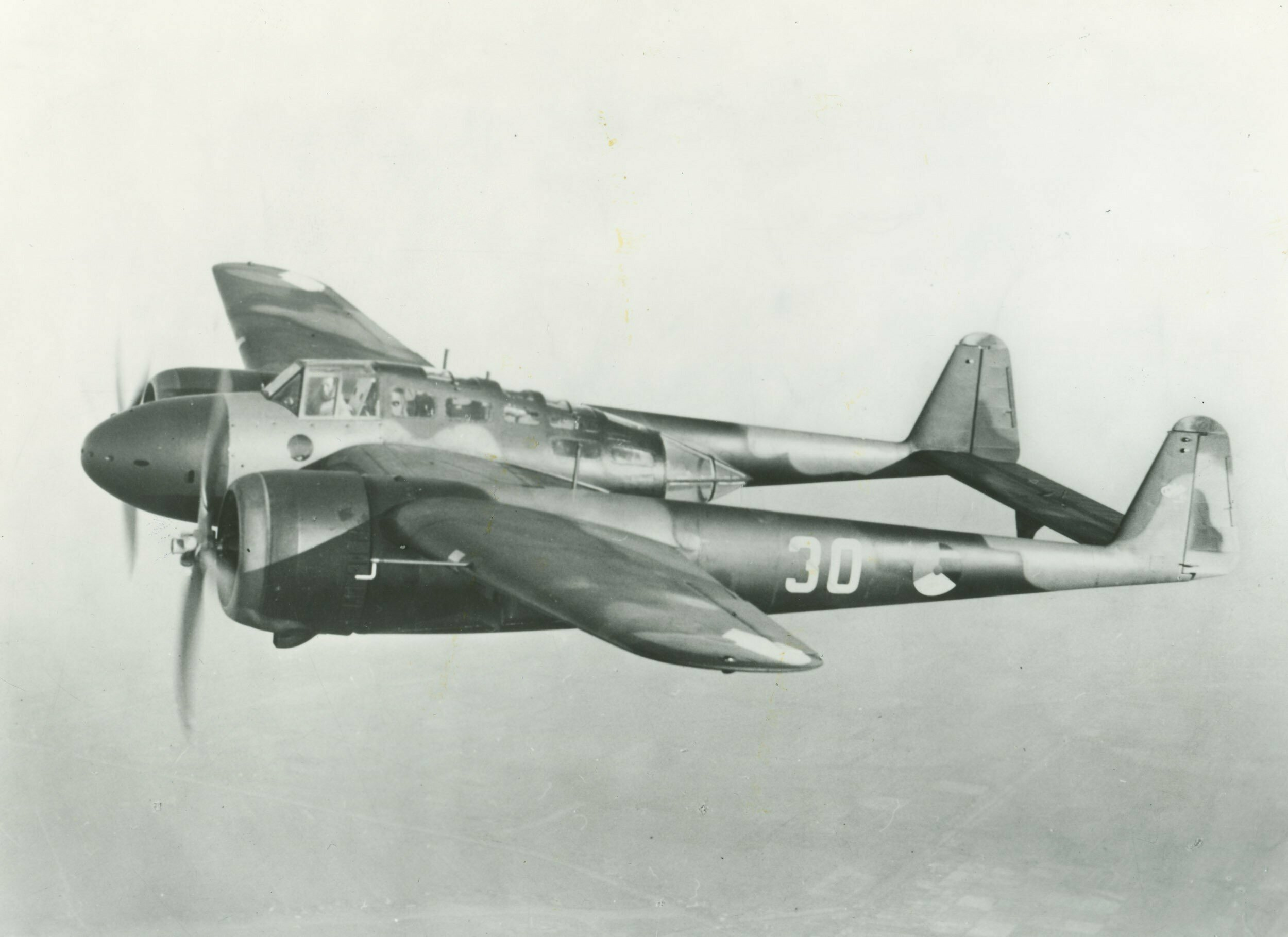
Fokker G.I Jachtkruiser

As war loomed, in July 1939 the Army Aviation Group was renamed the Army Aviation Brigade (Luchtvaartbrigade).

In August 1939, the Netherlands government mobilised its armed forces, but due to limited budgets the Army Aviation Brigade operated only 176 combat aircraft of the following types:

- 16 Fokker T.V type bombers
- 36 Fokker D.XXI single-engine fighters
- 35 Fokker G.I twin-engine fighters
- 7 Fokker D.XVII single-engine fighters
- 17 Douglas DB-8A-3N light bombers
- 20 Fokker C.X light bombers
- 33 Fokker C.V reconnaissance aircraft
- 20 Koolhoven F.K.51 artillery observer aircraft

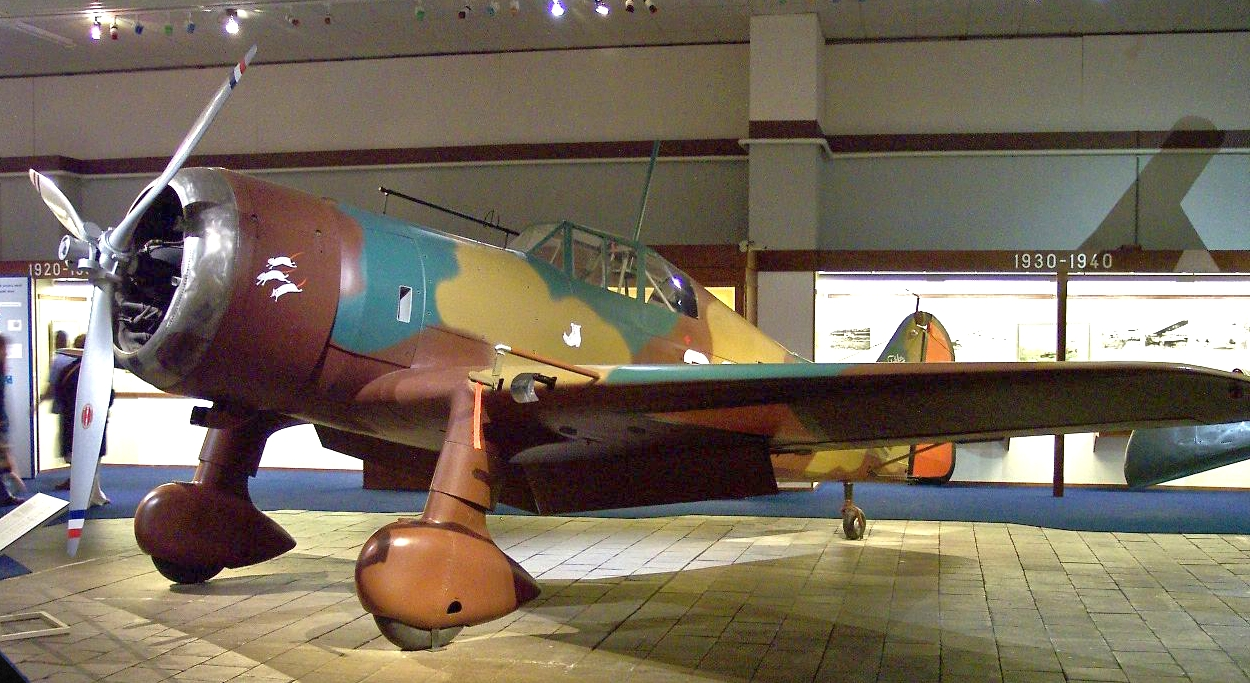
Fokker D.XXI at the Air Force Museum in Soesterberg

In May 1940, Germany invaded the Netherlands. Within five days the Dutch Army Aviation Brigade was defeated by the Luftwaffe. All of the Brigade's bombers, along with 30 D.XXI and 17 G.I fighters were shot down; two D.XXI and eight G.I were destroyed on the ground. Two G.I were captured by German forces, one of which was later flown to England by a Fokker pilot. The Douglas bombers were used as fighters because no suitable bombs were available; these aircraft were poorly suited for this role and eight were shot down and three destroyed on the ground in the first hours of the conflict.

In spite of their numerical superiority the Luftwaffe lost 350 aircraft in the conquest of the Netherlands, many to anti-aircraft fire and crashes at improvised landing fields in the Netherlands rather than due to action by Dutch fighter aircraft. The cost was high – almost 95% of the Dutch pilots were lost. In recognition of their actions Queen Wilhelmina granted the highest Dutch military decoration, the Militaire Willemsorde (MWO), to the Army Aviation Brigade collectively.

Some aircrews escaped to England and on 1 June 1940, 320 Squadron and 321 Squadron were established there under RAF operational command. Due to a shortage of personnel, 321 Squadron was absorbed by 320 Sqn in January 1941. Although their personnel were predominantly from the Navy Air Service, Army Aviation aircrew also served with 320 Sqn until the end of the war.

In 1941, the Royal Netherlands Military Flying School was re-established, in the United States at Jackson Field (also known as Hawkins Field), Jackson, Mississippi, operating lend-lease aircraft and training all military aircrew for the Netherlands.

The separate Militaire Luchtvaart van het Koninklijk Nederlands-Indisch Leger (ML-KNIL; Royal Netherlands East Indies Army Military Air Service) continued in the Netherlands East Indies (NEI), until its occupation by Japan in 1942. Some personnel escaped to Australia and Ceylon. 321 Squadron was re-formed in Ceylon, in March 1942, from Dutch aviators.

In 1942, 18 (NEI) Squadron, a joint Dutch-Australian unit was established, in Canberra, equipped with B-25 Mitchell bombers. It saw action in the South West Pacific Area (SWPA), which included the Dutch East Indies. In 1943, 120 (NEI) Squadron was established. Equipped with Kittyhawk fighters, it flew many missions under Australian command, including the recapturing of Dutch New Guinea. In 1944, transport aircraft operated by the KNIL in the SWPA were integrated into another joint unit, 19 (NEI) Squadron.

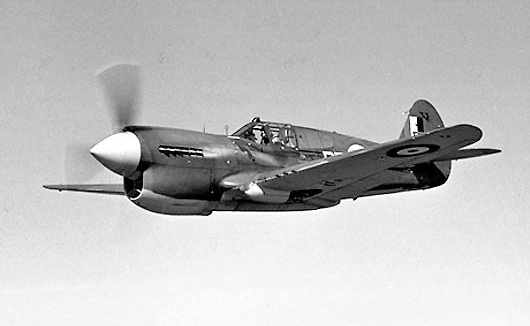
Curtiss P-40 Warhawk

In June 1943, a Dutch fighter squadron was established in England. 322 (Dutch) Squadron, equipped with the Supermarine Spitfire, saw action as part of the RAF. 322 Sqn aircraft featured the British RAF roundels as well as the Dutch orange triangle. 322 Sqn was successfully deployed against incoming V-1 flying bombs. From mid-1944, during the invasion of Normandy, it executed ground attack missions over France and Belgium.

In July 1944, the Directorate of Netherlands Airpower was established in London.

==== Late 1940s and early 1950s ====
In 1947, its Chief of Air Force Staff was appointed.

During the Indonesian War of Independence, the air force committed ground attacks and transported material and personnel. In 1948, transportation aircraft were used in support of the first Dutch airborne raid in southern Sumatra and Djokjakarta.

In 1951 several non-combat functions in the Army Aviation were opened to women.

=== Royal Netherlands Air Force ===
On 27 March 1953 the Royal Netherlands Air Force officially became an independent part of the Dutch armed forces, rather than part of the Army.

The Air Defense Command, (Commando Lucht Verdediging, abbreviated CLV) consisting of a command unit, five radar stations and six fighter squadrons, had been established. Its radar equipment as well as its air defense fighters all came from obsolete RAF stocks.

- The Spitfire Mk.IX was used by 322 Squadron RNLAF until 1954 but was replaced as new squadrons were established.
- The Gloster Meteor F Mk.IV was used by 322, 323, 324, 325, 326, 327 and 328 Squadrons from 1948 to 1957. Bases included Soesterberg and Leeuwarden.
- The Gloster Meteor F Mk.VIII was used by 322, 323, 324, 325, 326, 327 and 328 sqn from 1951 to 1958.

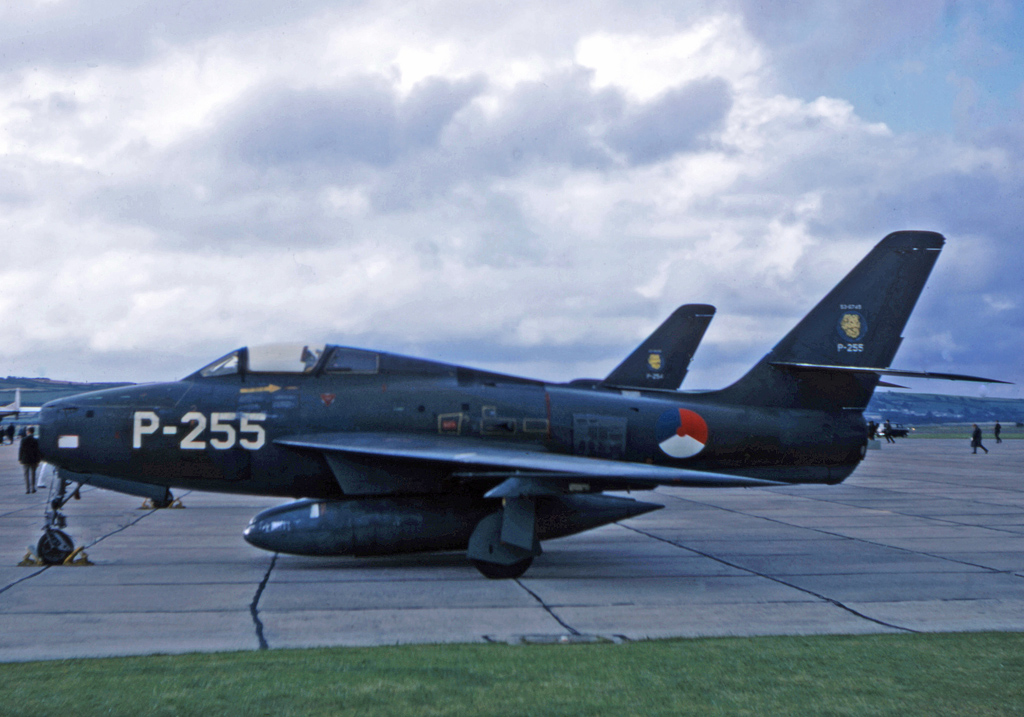
F-84F Thunderstreaks of 315 Squadron RNLAF fitted with extra fuel tanks at RAF Chivenor in 1969

After the Netherlands joined NATO another new command: Tactical Air Command (Commando Tactische Luchtstrijdkrachten, abbreviated CTL) was established.

- CTL consisted of seven new strike squadrons (306, 311, 312, 313, 314, 315 and 316 sqn), all equipped with Republic F-84G Thunderjets. These aircraft were supplied by the United States under the Mutual Defense Aid Program from 1952 to 1956. 311 was the first flying squadron to be stood up at Volkel on 1 May 1951.
- 322, 323, 324, 325, 326 and 327 Sqn operated the Hawker Hunter F Mk.4 between 1955 and 1964, and 322, 324, 325 and 326 Sqn operated the Hawker Hunter F Mk.6 between 1957 and 1968.
- 700, 701 and 702 Sqn operated the North American F-86K Sabre all-weather fighter between 1955 and 1964.
- 306, 311, 312, 313, 314, 315 and 316 Sqn changed aircraft configuration from 1955 to 1970 as the Republic F-84F Thunderstreak and RF-84F Thunderflash became available.

==== Western New Guinea conflict ====
Video of RNLAF aircraft in 1961 from a Dutch newsreel

The Indonesian government claimed Western New Guinea following the end of the Second World War. The Dutch government considered the area Dutch territory. Negotiations over the country were conducted for years, but tensions grew until Indonesia broke diplomatic relations with the Netherlands at the end of the 1950s.

In response, in 1958, the Netherlands deployed military reinforcements to New Guinea, including an Air Force detachment for the air defense of the island Biak as there was evidence that Indonesia was infiltrating the island in advance of a military operation.

The first Air Force contribution was the installation of two MkIV early warning radars on Biak and Woendi islands.

The political situation between the Netherlands and Indonesia continued to deteriorate and in 1960 the Dutch government deployed reinforcements. The operations were known by name as Plan Fidelio. For the Dutch Air Force this meant the establishment of an Air Defense Command for New Guinea (Commando Luchtverdediging Nederlands Nieuw-Guinea - CLV NNG) consisting of:

- One Hawker Hunter Mk.4 air defence squadron.
- A radar navigation system at Biak.
- A reserve airstrip at Noemfoer.

The Dutch government deployed a squadron consisting of 12 Hawker Hunter Mk.4 AD fighters and two Alouette II SAR helicopters. They were transported to Southeast Asia by the Karel Doorman. One year later the Dutch government deployed another 12 Hawker Hunter Mk6 AD fighters; these aircraft carried more fuel and had a larger combat radius.

In August 1962 Indonesia was ready to attack New Guinea. Despite reinforcements the Dutch defences would be insufficient to withstand the coming attack. Therefore, and because of international political pressure the Dutch government was forced to agree to the peaceful surrender of New Guinea. Dutch forces were withdrawn from the territory.

The establishment of 336 transport squadron is closely connected to New Guinea. Soon after activation this unit was deployed to New Guinea to take over air transport from the Dutch Navy. 336 Sqn deployed and took over three Navy Dakotas and three US supplied aircraft. 336 Sqn operated from Mokmer airstrip and transported more than 5,400 passengers between September 1961 and September 1962.

==== Cold War era, 1960s, 1970s and later ====
During the Cold War Dutch Air Force flying units were integrated in NATO's Second Allied Tactical Air Force tasked with defending northern West Germany against Warsaw Pact forces. Additionally, the Dutch Air Force manned five fully operational self-supporting Missile Groups in West Germany (1 and 2 MslGrp were initially equipped with NIKE batteries, while 3,4 and 5 MslGrp were equipped with Hawk) and replaced by the MIM-104 Patriot Air Defence Missile System:

- 306, 311, 312, 322 and 323 Sqn changed configuration again from 1962 to 1984 after the dual role F-104 Starfighter was introduced.
- 313, 314, 315 and 316 Sqn switched over to the NF-5 Freedom Fighter from 1969 to 1991. The NF-5 was a development of the Canadair CF-5 fighter. Northrop incorporated some NF-5 features into the F-5E/F Tiger II.
- Since 1979 all RNLAF fast-jet squadrons (originally 306, 311, 312, 313, 314, 315, 316, 322 and 323) have operated the multi role F-16 Fighting Falcon.

The Dutch Air Force played a key role in ending the 1977 Dutch train hostage crisis when six F-104G Starfighters flew low over the train to distract the hijackers while Dutch anti-terrorist forces stormed the train.

==== Former Yugoslavia ====
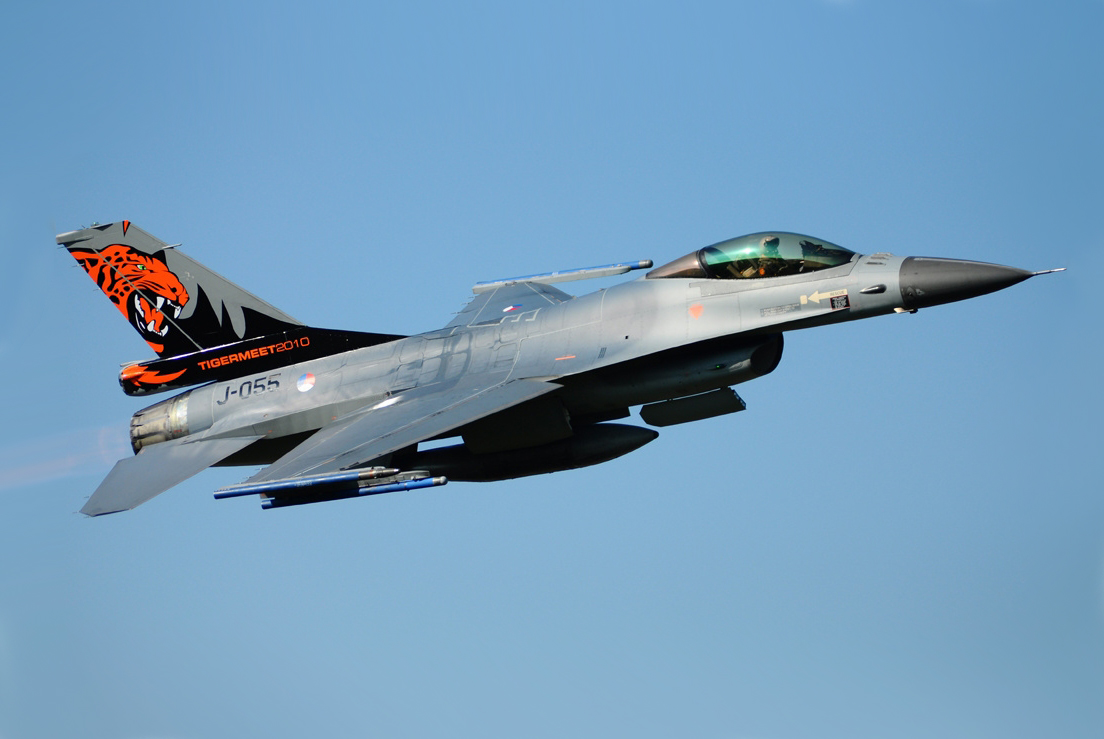
Royal Netherlands Air Force F-16AM arriving for the Royal International Air Tattoo, England, 2014

In 1992 Ypenburg Air Base closed. After the USAF handed over their section of Soesterberg in September 1994, Soesterberg then became a RNLAF transport helicopter base with 298 Squadron (CH-47D Chinook) and 300 Squadron (AS 532U2 Cougar Mk2 and SA 316 Alouette III) stationed at the base.

RNLAF F-16s participated in all operations over Yugoslavia from 1993: Deny Flight, including Deliberate Force in 1995 and ending with Operation Allied Force in 1999 from two bases in Italy. Initially from Villafranca AB in the north of Italy, later moving south to Amendola AB. During the operations over FRY RNLAF F-16s flew reconnaissance (306 Sqn detachments from Volkel AB were in theatre throughout the operations), enforced the Bosnian no-fly zone, dropped bombs on Udbina AB (1994), successfully dropped an unguided bomb on a moving Serb tank during the fall of Srebrenica (1995), and took part in Deliberate Force later in the summer of 1995.

Between 1994 and 1997 Dutch GCI personnel, along with Canadian GCI controllers, provided many hundreds of hours of fighter control and surveillance as integrated members of USAF/ANG Air Control Squadrons. In May 1999 during the Kosovo crisis a RNLAF F-16AM pilot Major Peter Tankink shot down a Yugoslavian MiG-29 with an AMRAAM, but the force was more recognized for its high bombing accuracy. Allied Force was also the operational debut for the upgraded F-16AM. Besides the CAP missions, offensive bombing and photo reconnaissance missions were flown. KDC-10 tankers refuelled allied aircraft over the Adriatic Sea, and C-130 Hercules transports flew daily sorties from Eindhoven AB to logistically support the operation. Dutch F-16s also dropped cluster bombs on Niš. In total, RNLAF aircraft flew 1,194 sorties during operation Allied Force, which is about 7.5% of the total 37,000 sorties flown.

==== Operation Enduring Freedom and NATO in Afghanistan ====
On 2 October 2002 a tri-national detachment of 18 Dutch, Danish and Norwegian F-16 ground attack aircraft and one Dutch KDC-10 tanker deployed to Manas Air Base in Kyrgyzstan in support of ground forces in Afghanistan as part of Operation Enduring Freedom. The KDC-10 returned to the Netherlands on 1 April 2003, and the Dutch F-16 detachment on 1 October 2003. The RNLAF returned to Manas AB on 8 September 2004 with five F-16 and one KDC-10 in support of the presidential elections of Afghanistan. This time the aircraft flew under the NATO ISAF flag. On 24 March 2005 the Dutch detachment transferred from Manas AB to Kabul International Airport. A detachment of six AH-64D Apache helicopters were already stationed at Kabul International Airport from April 2004 until March 2005.

In February 2006 four Dutch F-16s were joined by four Royal Norwegian Air Force F-16s in a detachment known as the 1st Netherlands-Norwegian European Participating Forces Expeditionary Air Wing (1 NLD/NOR EEAW). This was a follow-up of the participation with the Belgian Air Component.

As part of the expanded NATO ISAF mission in southern Afghanistan in August 2006, the Royal Netherlands Air Force had three CH-47D Chinook of 298 Sq stationed at Kandahar Airfield. On 12 November 2006 eight F-16s transferred from Kabul International Airport to Kandahar Airfield, Additionally, a detachment of six (later four) AH-64D Apache helicopters had been stationed of Tarin Kowt, Uruzgan province. The CH-47D Chinooks of 298 sq rotated with Cougars from 300 sq. All helicopters together with a few F-16s returned to the Netherlands in November 2010. The other four F-16s transferred from Kandahar Airfield to Mazar-e-Sharif International Airport in November 2011. The F-16 flight, providing Close Air Support for ground forces and Recce Flights (specialised in counter-IEDs), ended their mission officially on 1 July 2014.

On 31 August 2006 a Royal Netherlands Air Force (Michael "Sofac" Donkervoort) pilot was killed when his plane crashed during a mission to support British ground troops in Helmand province.

On 7 December 2007 military use of Twente Air Base ceased. The aerodrome is now known as Enschede Airport Twente. Flying officially ended at Soesterberg Air Base on 12 November 2008. The last jet ever to take off was a Hellenic AF F-4E. The base closed on 31 December 2008. The 298th and 300th squadron moved to Gilze-Rijen Air Base. A part of the base remains in use as a glider field. The former USAFE side will be in use by ground units relocated from Kamp van Zeist and will be called "Camp New Amsterdam". The AF museum (Royal Netherlands Military Aviation Museum) returned to the base and will use most of the existing hangars.

==== 2010s and 2020s ====
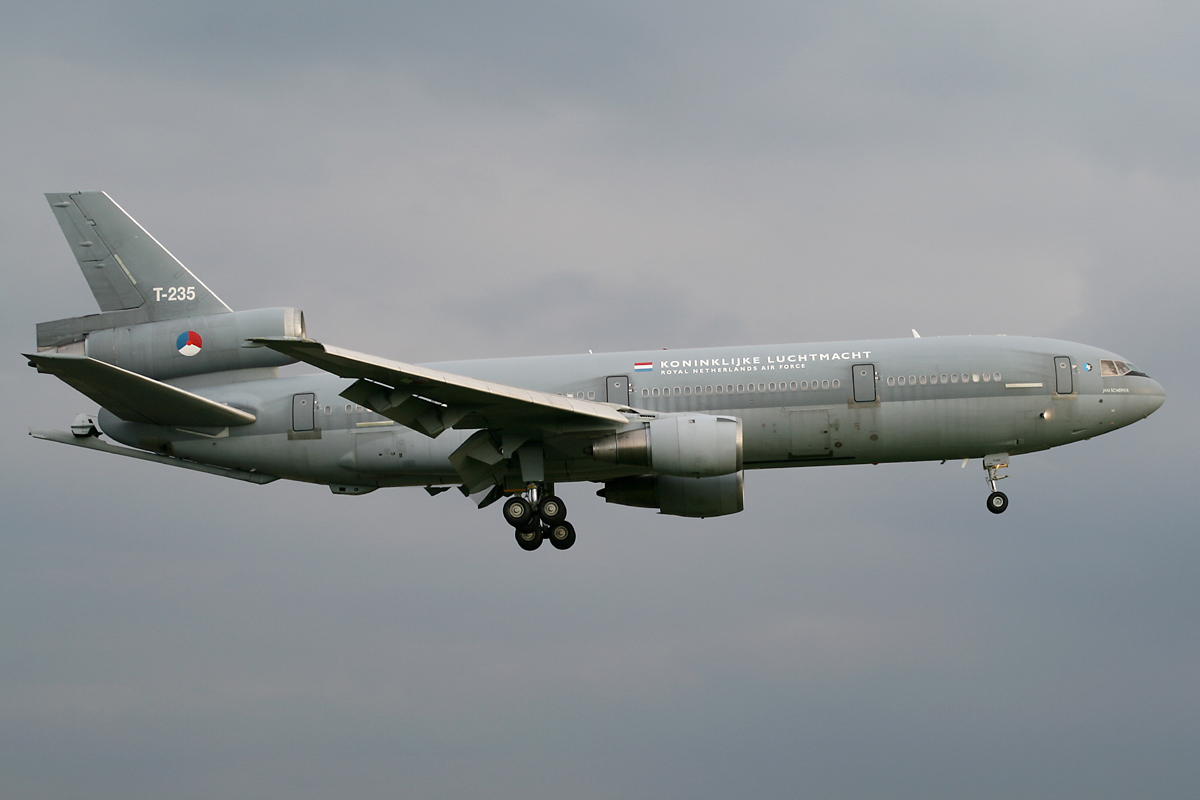
KDC-10 in support of NATO aircraft

In 2013 the Royal Netherlands Air Force provided Strategic Airlift Support with a KDC-10 in support of French operations in Mali.

The RNLAF was hit hard by the Dutch defence cuts after the 2008 financial crisis. 311 Squadron was disbanded in September 2012, leaving four squadrons of F-16s, and one DC-10 transport aircraft was disposed of.

In October 2014 the Netherlands Air Force joined the US and its Allies fighting ISIL, deploying eight F-16s (of which two are in reserve) to Jordan.

On 31 October 2014 323 Tactess squadron (F-16) disbanded and its aircraft and personnel were merged into 322 Squadron. The following Wednesday (5 November) the squadron reformed in the US as the RNLAF's first Joint Strike Fighter unit.

303 Squadron (Agusta Bell AB 412SP) provided search and rescue within Dutch Flight Information Region) until 1 January 2015 when the unit was disbanded.

In 2015 Airbus A330 MRTT were ordered to replace two Dutch KDC-10 Tanker / Transport aircraft. The Netherlands is the lead nation in NATO initiative to replace and pool existing Tanker / Transport, including Luxembourg, Belgium (1), Germany (4), Norway (1) within EATC, in 2014 it was announced that the Airbus A330 MRTT has been selected and two are ordered for the Royal Netherlands Air Force with options to eight aircraft based in adjoining countries. In 2017 the Belgian Air Component, German Air Force and Royal Norwegian Air Force confirmed orders by joining the MMF program to a total of 9 aircraft of which 5 will be based at Eindhoven Airbase and 4 at Cologne Air Base. They will carry Royal Netherlands Air Force roundels and be registered as Dutch aircraft. In November 2019 it was announced that the Dutch KDC-10 tankers were sold to Omega Aerial Refueling Services. The last Dutch KDC-10 was taken out of service in October 2021.

As per 2017 the Air Defence - Quick Reaction Force of two F-16 fighters are integrated for Belgian, Dutch and Luxembourg airspace and rotated between Dutch and Belgian ADF squadrons.

In 2021 a Brik-II satellite was launched to provide the Royal Netherlands Air Force with intelligence regarding navigation, communication and observation of the earth.

In May 2022 it was reported that several MQ-9 Reapers would be used to patrol in the Dutch Caribbean.

On 27 September 2024 the RNLAF formally retired the F-16 after 45 years of service. A farewell flight was held on the same day in which the aircraft flew past several military airfields in the Netherlands. As of November 2025, almost all of Netherlands' F-16s have been sold/donated to other countries.

In November 2024 it was announced that in 2028 the Dutch satellite PAMI-1 will be launched and will be used by the Defensie Space Security Center (DSSC), which is part of the RNLAF. That same month it was also announced that a contract to purchase 12 Airbus H225M helicopters had been signed.

On 9 September 2025 the RNLASF, with support of fellow NATO countries, shot down multiple Russian drones that had entered Polish airspace.

On 27 and 28 January 2026 four F-35s and a single A330 MRRT tanker aircraft of the RNLASF participated in exercises at Schiphol Airport.

==== Operation Inherent Resolve ====
From 2014 the Royal Netherlands Air Force provided eight F-16s in support of the coalition fighting IS. The aircraft were initially deployed in Iraq and later in Syria. The mission was handed over to the Belgian Air Component in July 2016 after more than 2,100 missions were flown, with weapons used over 1,800 times. The Royal Netherlands Air Force contributed extensively to the missions flown by the coalition forces and were in high demand.

Since 2017, RNLAF KDC-10 and C-130H Hercules are deployed to the Middle East to assist the United States led coalition in Operation Inherent Resolve.

In January 2018 the Dutch F-16s returned to the Middle East for a year-long deployment.

== Structure ==
Royal Netherlands Air and Space Force organization as of November 2026 (click to enlarge)

- Commander of the Royal Netherlands Air and Space Force
  - Air and Space Force Command Staff
  - Volkel Air Base
  - Leeuwarden Air Base
  - Eindhoven Air Base
  - Defense Helicopter Command
  - Air Operations Control Station Nieuw-Milligen
  - Royal Netherlands Air Force Military School-Woensdrecht Air Base
  - Woensdrecht Logistic Centre
  - People and Aviation Centre

The RNLASF is in the process of restructuring into four major commands:

- Air Combat Command (ACC), bringing together Leeuwarden and Volkel air bases and the Air Operations Control Station Nieuw Milligen through the restructuring of the Air Force Staff Department for Fighter Operations (Afdeling Jachtvlieg Operaties (AJO))
- Air Mobility Command (AMC) on the basis of Eindhoven air base through the restructuring of Air Force Staff Department for Air Transport Operations (Afdelingen Luchttransport Operaties (ALTO)). Eindhoven air base has been officially transformed and designated as Vliegbasis Eindhoven - Air Mobility Command.
- Defence Helicopter Command (DHC) - the previously joint command of tactical helicopters of the Royal Netherlands Air Force and the naval helicopters of the Royal Netherlands Navy has been fully integrated into the RNLASF.
- Air Support Command (ASC) - ground operational support to the flying units.

Another command related to air warfare is the Joint Ground-based Air Defence Command. The RNLASF's Patriot and Stinger missile air defence batteries are part of the air force, but come operationally under the JGADC, together with the 61st Missile Air Defence Group of the German Air Force. The JGADC is subordinated to the Royal Netherlands Army.

The force structure reform is done in line with the concept called Fifth Generation Air Force (5e generatie luchtmacht) and in addition to the reshuffling of the RNLASF in four major commands the concept plans for:

- Replacement of the F-16 by the F-35A in three squadrons (completed)
- Replacement of the KDC-10 by the A330 MRTT (completed)
- Replacement of the C-130H Hercules by 5 Embraer C-390 Millennium (in progress)
- Introduction of additional- & armed MQ-9 Reapers (completed)
- Upgrade of the Chinook fleet to the CH-47F MYII CAAS standard (completed)
- Upgrading the AH-64D Apache to the AH-64E Guardian standard, incl. Joint Air to Ground Missile (in progress)
- Forming a Joint Target Support Cell (completed)
- Forming an Air Command and Control capacity (completed)
- Forming a Fighter Center of Excellence (completed)
- Forming a dedicated SOF Rotary Wing Air by upgrading and re-tasking the existing Cougar fleet and acquisition of 12 H225M Caracals from 2028 onwards (in progress)
- Forming a National Air and Space Operations Center (NASOC) (completed)
- Combining Helicopter Training with German Army at Bückeburg Air Base (In progress)
- Acquiring strategic air to ground weapons for F-35A such as AGM-158 JASSM-ER & AGM-88G (in progress)
- Replacing PC-7 Basic Training Aircraft with PC-7 MKX (in progress)

=== Rank structure ===
==== Commissioned officer ranks ====
The rank insignia of commissioned officers.

NATO code	OF-10	OF-9	OF-8	OF-7	OF-6	OF-5	OF-4	OF-3	OF-2	OF-1
Royal Netherlands Air and Space Force
Royal Netherlands Air and Space Force		Generaal	Luitenant-generaal	Generaal-majoor	Commodore	Kolonel	Luitenant-kolonel	Majoor	Kapitein	Eerste luitenant	Tweede luitenant

The rank insignia of non-commissioned officers and enlisted personnel.

NATO code	OR-9	OR-8	OR-7	OR-6	OR-5	OR-4	OR-3	OR-2		OR-1
Royal Netherlands Air and Space Force
Royal Netherlands Air and Space Force	Adjudant-onderofficier		Sergeant-majoor	Sergeant der 1e klasse	Sergeant	Korporaal der 1e klasse	Korporaal	Soldaat der 1ste klasse	Soldaat der 2de klasse	Soldaat der 3de klasse

==== Royal insignia ====
The rank insignia worn by the monarch of the Netherlands when wearing the uniform of the Royal Netherlands Air and Space Force.

Royal insignia
Koning der Nederlanden

== Aircraft ==
=== Current inventory ===
Aircraft	Origin	Type	Variant	In service	Notes
Combat aircraft
F-35 Lightning II	United States	Multirole fighter	F-35A	44	8 aircraft used for training. 5 more planned to be ordered.
AEW&C / SIGINT
Saab GlobalEye	Sweden; Canada	AEW&C / SIGINT	GlobalEye 6500	0	Letter of intent for 1 GlobalEye (would be pooled and operated with the Swedish Air Force).
Tanker
Airbus A330 MRTT	Europe	Tanker / Transport	A330-200 MRTT	10	2 more on order. Shared through the NATO MMR fleet.
Transport
C-130 Hercules	United States	Tactical airlifter	C-130H	2	
C-130 Hercules	United States	Tactical airlifter	C-130H-30	2	
C-390 Millennium	Brazil	Tactical airlifter	C-390M	0 (+5 on order)	
Gulfstream G650	United States	VIP transport	G650ER	1	
Helicopters
AH-64 Apache	United States	Attack	AH-64E	28	8 of which remain to be modernised.
CH-47 Chinook	United States	Heavy lift	CH-47F	20	
NHIndustries NH90	Europe	ASW / Transport (Amphibious support)	NFH	19 (+ 3 on order)	
AS532 Cougar	France	CSAR / Transport	AS532 U2	12	
H225M Caracal	Europe	CSAR / Transport	H225M CSAR	0 (+12 on order)	Ordered in 2024.
Trainer aircraft
F-35 Lightning II	United States	Conversion training aircraft	F-35A	8	Aircraft based in the USA (Luke Air Base).
Pilatus PC-7	Switzerland	Trainer	Pilatus PC-7	13	To be replaced by PC-7 MKX
Pilatus PC-7	Switzerland	Trainer	PC-7 MKX	0 (+8 on order)	
UCAV
MQ-9A Reaper	United States	Strike / Surveillance	Block 5	8	
Satellites
ICEYE SAR	Finland	High resolution synthetic-aperture imaging radar		1 (+3 on order)	

The F-16 inventory of the Netherlands Air Force stood at 42 before the announcement was made that these would be transferred to the Ukrainian Air Force as part of the Dutch assistance package. The first 10 are transferred as per December 2023, with over 20 as per June 2024. 18 were donated to Romania. As of November 2025, all of Netherlands' 42 F-16s have been transferred.

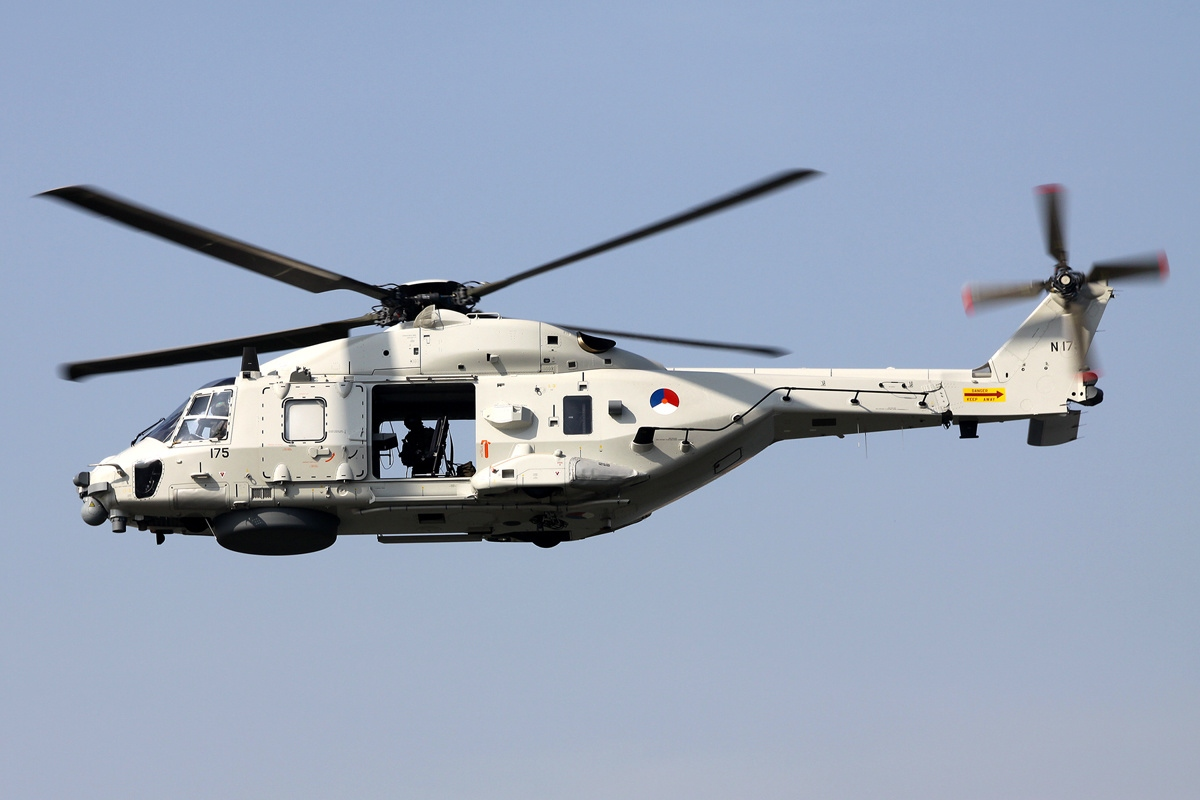
An NH90 NFH helicopter

=== Future systems ===
==== F-35A ====
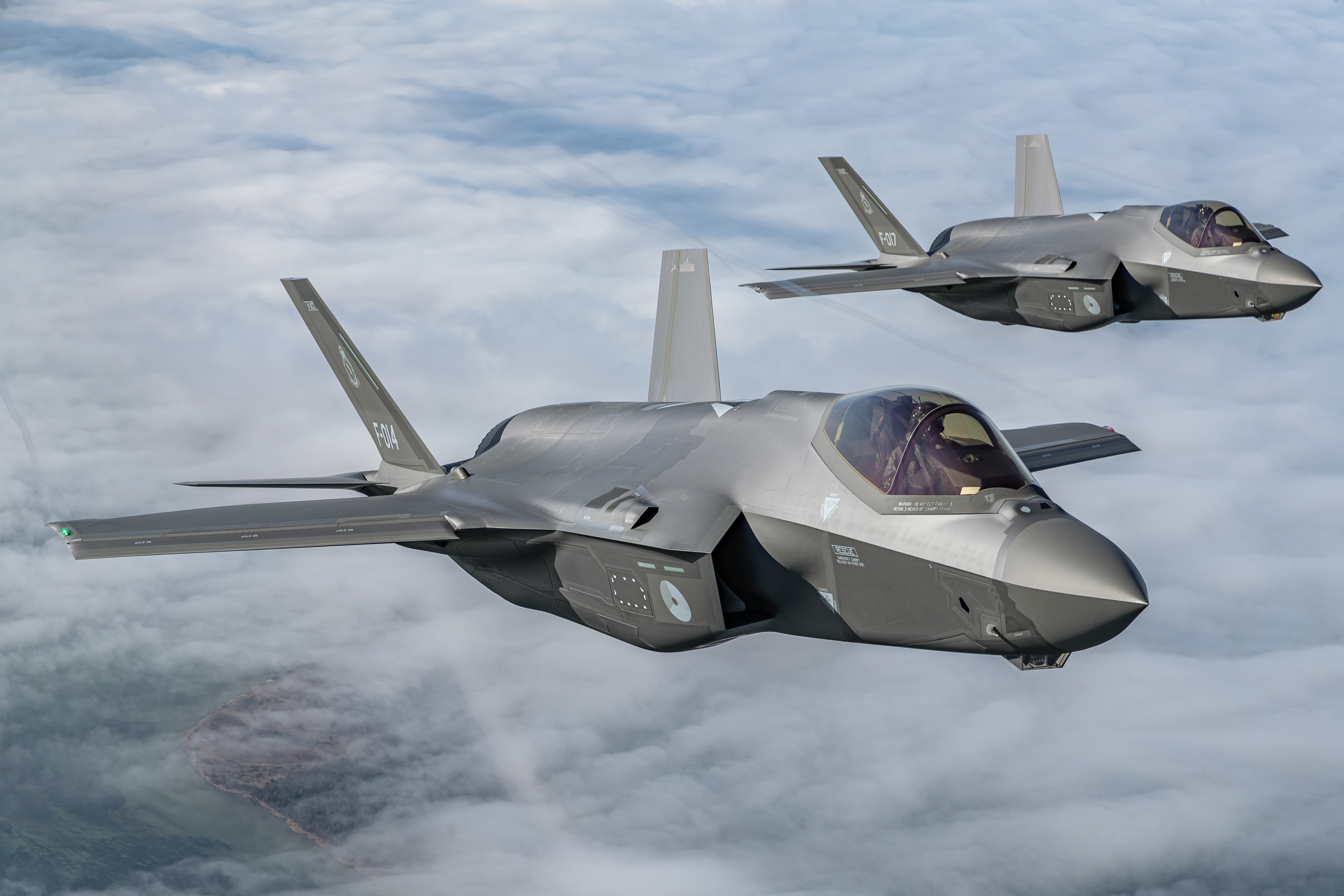
F-35As of No. 322 Squadron

To replace its F-16 fleet the RNLAF considered the Lockheed Martin F-16 Block 52/60, the Dassault Rafale, the Eurofighter Typhoon, the Saab JAS 39 Gripen, the Boeing F/A-18E/F Super Hornet and the Lockheed Martin F-35A Lightning II. In 2002 the Netherlands signed a Memorandum Of Understanding (MOU) to co-develop the F-35 as a 'Tier 2' Partner. Two test aircraft were ordered between 2009 and 2011. Two F-35A have been delivered for the testing program and for training pilots and maintenance crew. This first aircraft is stationed at a base in Florida, US.

On 17 September 2013 the F-35A was officially selected as the replacement for the Royal Netherlands Air Force F-16 MLU, the Ministry of Defense announced that it will buy 35 additional F-35As between 2014 and 2023, bringing the total to 37, the maximum number fitting the original budget for F-16 replacement. In February 2014 Parliament approved the purchase of the first batch of eight F-35A aircraft, to be delivered from 2019. The purchase of fifteen additional aircraft was announced by the Dutch government in December 2018 for a third squadron to NATO, totalling 52 jets, the first batch of nine additional aircraft was ordered in 2019. In 2022 the acquisition of six additional F-35As was announced to set up a third squadron as requested by NATO. In September 2024 the acquisition of six additional aircraft was announced to supplement the existing three squadrons.

==== C-390 Millennium ====
The RNLASF is expected to receive its first Embraer C-390 Millennium in 2027. The C-390 will replace the Lockheed C-130 Hercules.

== See also ==
- Netherlands Naval Aviation Service
- Solo Display Team

== Bibliography ==
- Anrig, Christian F. (2011). The quest for relevant air power : continental European responses to the air power challenges of the post–Cold War era (PDF). Maxwell AFB: Air University Press. ISBN 978-1249030447.
- Bernstein, J (2005). AH-64 Apache Units of Operations Enduring Freedom and Iraqi Freedom. UK: Osprey Publishing Ltd. ISBN 1-84176-848-0.
- L, Klemen (2000). "Forgotten Campaign: The Dutch East Indies Campaign 1941–1942". Archived from the original on 26 July 2011.
- Klaauw, Bart van der (March–April 1999). "Unexpected Windfalls: Accidentally or Deliberately, More than 100 Aircraft 'arrived' in Dutch Territory During the Great War". Air Enthusiast (80): 54–59. ISSN 0143-5450.
- Owers, Colin (Spring 1994). "Fokker's Fifth: The C.V Multi-role Biplane". Air Enthusiast. No. 53. pp. 60–68. ISSN 0143-5450.
