= 303 BC =

303 BC in various calendars
- Gregorian calendar: 303 BC; CCCIII BC
- Ab urbe condita: 451
- Ancient Egypt era: XXXIII dynasty, 21
- Pharaoh: Ptolemy I Soter, 21
- Ancient Greek Olympiad (summer): 119th Olympiad, year 2
- Assyrian calendar: 4448
- Balinese saka calendar: N/A
- Bengali calendar: −896 – −895
- Berber calendar: 648
- Buddhist calendar: 242
- Burmese calendar: −940
- Byzantine calendar: 5206–5207
- Chinese calendar: 丁巳年 (Fire Snake); 2395 or 2188 — to — 戊午年 (Earth Horse); 2396 or 2189
- Coptic calendar: −586 – −585
- Discordian calendar: 864
- Ethiopian calendar: −310 – −309
- Hebrew calendar: 3458–3459
- Hindu calendars
- Vikram Samvat: −246 – −245
- Shaka Samvat: N/A
- Kali Yuga: 2798–2799
- Holocene calendar: 9698
- Iranian calendar: 924 BP – 923 BP
- Islamic calendar: 952 BH – 951 BH
- Javanese calendar: N/A
- Julian calendar: N/A
- Korean calendar: 2031
- Minguo calendar: 2214 before ROC 民前2214年
- Nanakshahi calendar: −1770
- Seleucid era: 9/10 AG
- Thai solar calendar: 240–241
- Tibetan calendar: མེ་མོ་སྦྲུལ་ལོ་ (female Fire-Snake) −176 or −557 or −1329 — to — ས་ཕོ་རྟ་ལོ་ (male Earth-Horse) −175 or −556 or −1328

Year 303 BC was a year of the pre-Julian Roman calendar. At the time, it was known as the Year of the Consulship of Lentulus and Aventinensis (or, less frequently, year 451 Ab urbe condita). The denomination 303 BC for this year has been used since the early medieval period, when the Anno Domini calendar era became the prevalent method in Europe for naming years.

== Events ==
=== By place ===
==== Seleucid Empire ====
- Seleucus I Nicator expands his kingdom throughout Persia as far east as India, but his advance is eventually halted by Chandragupta Maurya, the founder of the Maurya dynasty of India. In a pact concluded by the two leaders, Seleucus agrees to territorial concessions in exchange for 500 war-trained elephants.
- Seleucus refounds the town of Orrhoa in northern Mesopotamia as a military colony and mixes Greek settlers with its eastern population. He names Edessa in memory of the ancient capital of Macedon.

==== Greece ====
- Cassander and Lysimachus persuade Seleucus and Ptolemy to join them in trying to destroy Antigonus.
- Demetrius Poliorcetes invades the Peloponnese and occupies Corinth, Sicyon, and Argos in the Peloponnese, and Achaea, Elis and almost all of Arcadia join his side.

==== Italy ====
- The citizens of Tarentum seek the help of the Spartan general, Cleonymus. He is able to pacify the Lucanians with the agreement of the Romans.

== Births ==
- Xiaowen of Qin, 34th Ruler of Qin (d. 251 BC)
