= No. 322 Squadron RNLAF =

- Active: 12 June 1943 – 7 October 1945; 27 September 1946 – October 1949; 1951 – 1962; April 1964 – present
- Country: Netherlands
- Branch: Royal Netherlands Air and Space Force
- Type: Active
- Role: Swing-role fighter squadron
- Part of: Air Combat Command
- Garrison/HQ: Leeuwarden Air Base
- Mottos: Dutch: Niet praten maar doen ("Actions, not words" or "Don't prattle, act")
- Mascots: Polly Grey, the parrot
- Equipment: F-35A Lightning II

No. 322 Squadron is the oldest operational squadron of the Royal Netherlands Air and Space Force (RNLASF). It currently operates the Lockheed Martin F-35A Lightning II from Leeuwarden Air Base, Friesland.

It was originally founded at RAF Woodvale, United Kingdom, on 12 June 1943 as No. 322 (Dutch) Squadron with Dutch personnel under Royal Air Force control. At the end of the war, 322e Jachtvliegtuig Afdeling of the Royal Netherlands Army was formed from the RAF squadron. Between 1980 and 2021, No. 322 Squadron flew the Fokker F-16A/B Fighting Falcon. It performed, much like the other Dutch F-16 units, a dual 'swing role' task: having both ground support and interceptor duties.

== History ==
=== British service ===
During the Battle of the Netherlands, many Dutch planes were destroyed by Nazi Germany's forces, but 350 German planes were shot down by the Dutch forces. After the battle, many pilots fled to the United Kingdom to continue the fight as part of the Allies. On 12 June 1943, No. 322 (Dutch) Squadron was formed at RAF Woodvale from a large contingent of Dutch crew who were part of No. 167 Squadron. From then until the end of the Second World War, No. 322 Squadron actively participated alongside other allied forces. After the war, No. 322 Squadron was disbanded as an RAF squadron on 7 October 1945.

=== Dutch service ===
==== 1946–1980 ====
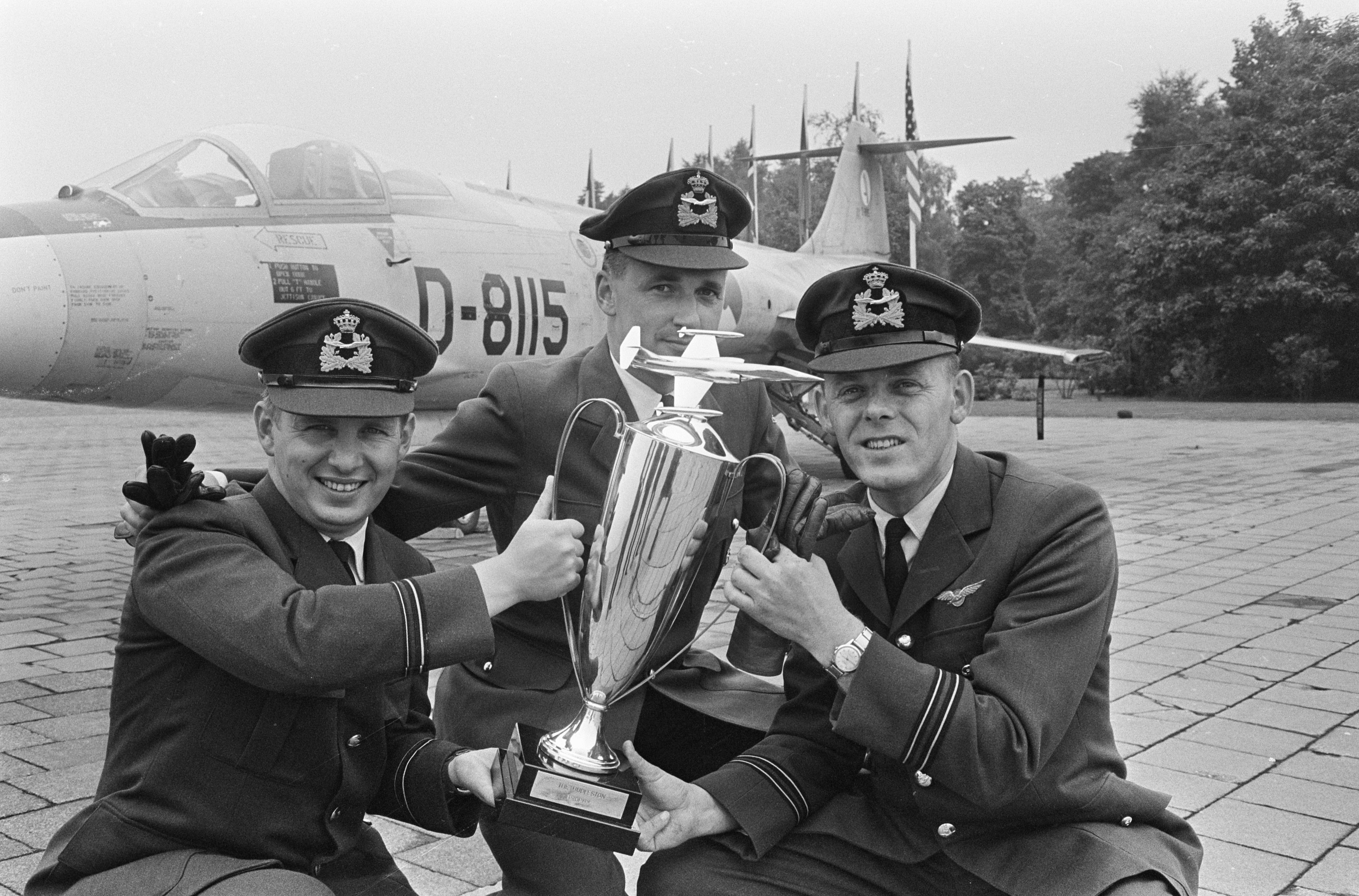
Crew of No. 322 Squadron after winning the 1966 AFCENT Air Defence Competition.

On 27 September 1946, No. 322 Squadron was reactivated as part of the Dutch Armed Forces, operating the Supermarine Spitfire Mk.IX. There was a Dutch School in Langham (Norfolk). In September 1947, the squadron was sent to the Dutch East Indies. Based at Kalidjati Air Base and later Kalibanteng Air Base the unit operated in the Dutch East Indies before returning to the Netherlands and disbanding in October 1949.

In 1951, No. 322 Squadron was reactivated at Twente Air Base, later relocating to Soesterberg Air Base. In July 1952, the squadron converted to its first jet aircraft – the Gloster Meteor F.4, further converting to the Meteor F.8 in 1953. The unit began to receive the Hawker Hunter in 1958. Between 1960 and 1962, No. 322 Squadron saw service in Dutch New Guinea between 1960 and 1962. Upon its return to the Netherlands in 1962, the unit was disbanded.

In April 1964, No. 322 Squadron was reformed at Leeuwarden Air Base, Friesland, with the Lockheed F-104G Starfighter and assigned the air defence mission. Probably the most unusual mission in the squadron's history was performed on Saturday morning 11 June 1977 at 05:00 AM. With thundering afterburners, six of its F-104s flew several very low passes over a hijacked train, initiating a successful operation that ended the 1977 Dutch train hijacking.

==== F-16 (1980–2021) ====
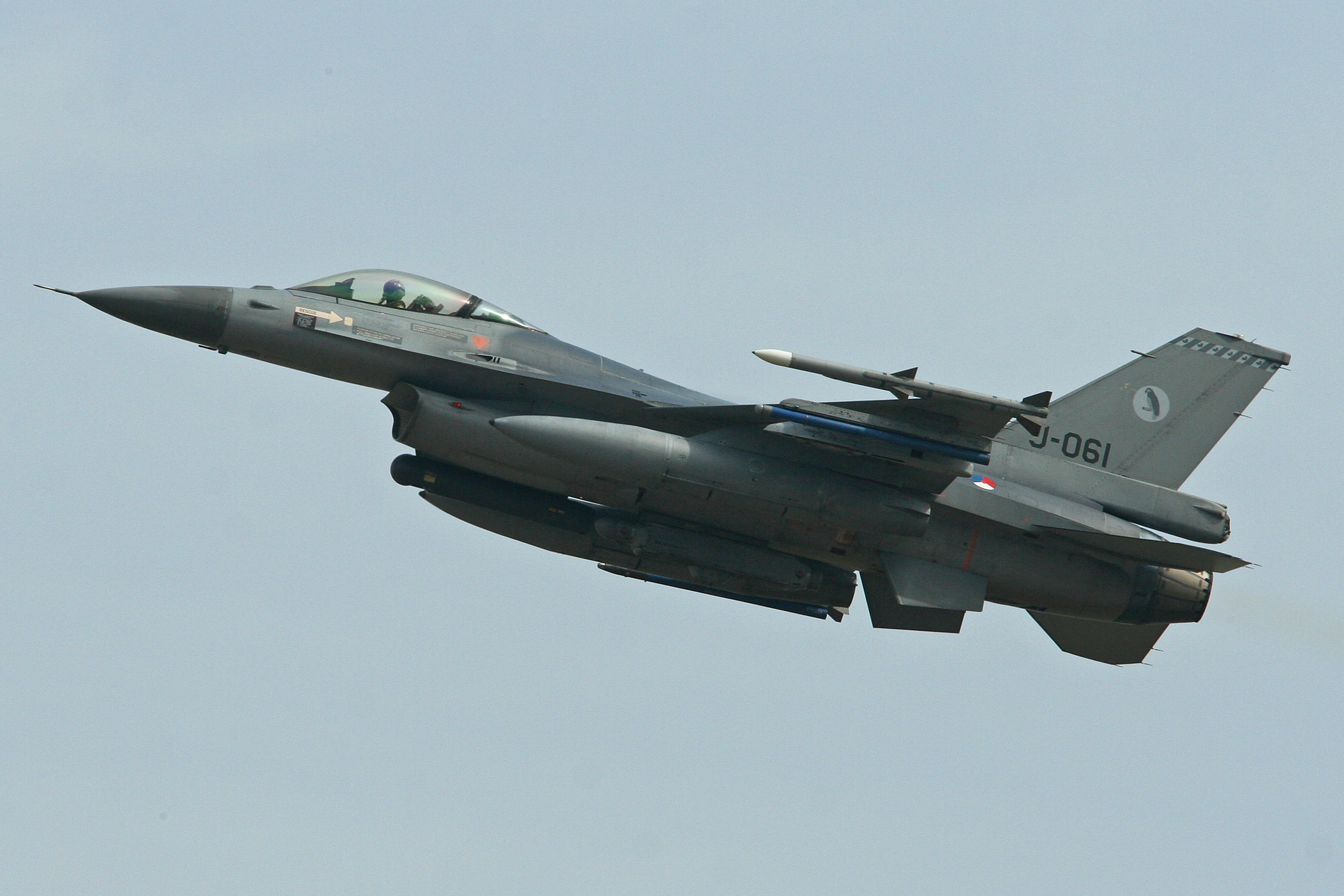
Fokker F-16AM Fighting Falcon J-061 departing RIAT, 2013.

In 1980, No. 322 Squadron converted to the Fokker F-16A/B Fighting Falcon. It became the first operational Dutch F-16 squadron on 1 May 1981.

Since the 1990s, the squadron has taken part in several NATO and UN missions. During the Yugoslav Wars, No. 322 Squadron made several deployments to Villafranca Air Base near Verona. From there it flew NATO missions over the former Yugoslavia. In 1995, during the fall of Srebrenica, two of its F-16s delivered the only bombs on the advancing Bosnian-Serb troops. The occasion marked the first attack by a female combat pilot in NATO, who scored a direct hit on a rolling Serbian tank using an (unguided) Mark 82 bomb.

Between 2003 and 2014, the squadron saw action over Afghanistan.

No. 322 Squadron carried out its last flight with the F-16AM on 5 July 2021, when four F-16s departed Leeuwarden AB to Volkel Air Base.

==== F-35 (2019–present) ====
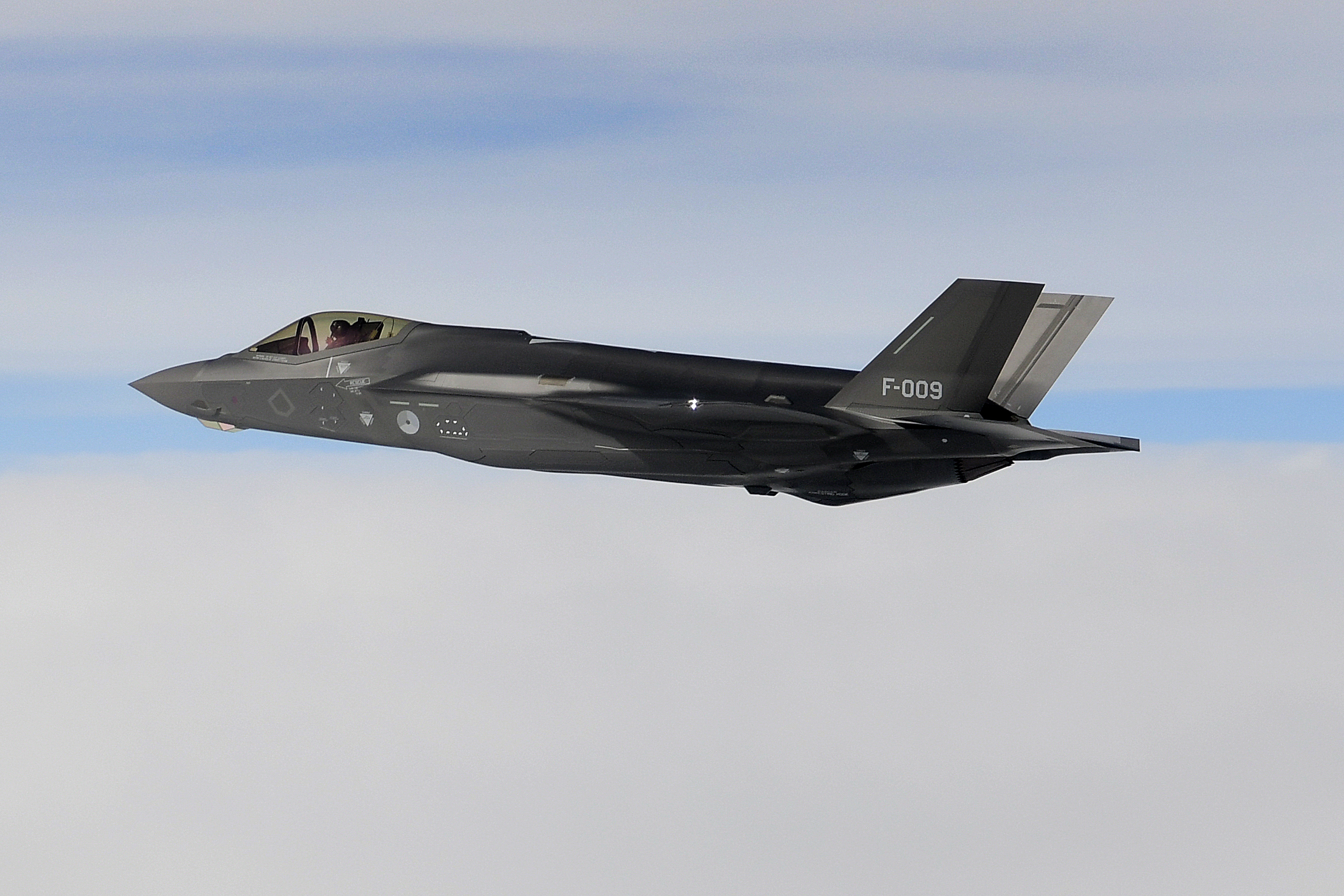
Lockheed Martin F-35A Lightning II F-009 in flight over the North Sea, 2020.

No. 322 Squadron received its first Lockheed Martin F-35A Lightning II (F-009) on 31 October 2019. On 27 December 2021, the squadron attained Initial Operation Capability (IOC). On 12 January 2022, No. 322 Squadron reached its full complement of fifteen F-35As when F-023 was delivered.

== Deployments ==
From	To	Mission	Country
1947	1949	-	Dutch East Indies
1960	1962	-	New Guinea
1993	1995	Deny Flight	Bosnia, Croatia, Kosovo
1995	1995	Deliberate Force	Bosnia, Herzegovina
1999	1999	-	Serbia
2002	2003	Enduring Freedom	Afghanistan
2005	2014	ISAF	Afghanistan
March 2011	August 2011	Unified Protector	Libya

== Aircraft operated ==
From	To	Aircraft	Version
1946	1953	Supermarine Spitfire	L.F. Mk.IX
1950	1953	Supermarine Spitfire	T.F. Mk.IX
1952	1953	Gloster Meteor	F. Mk.4
1952	1957	Gloster Meteor	T. Mk.7
1953	1957	Gloster Meteor	F. Mk.8
1958	1958	Hawker Hunter	F. Mk.4
1958	1960	Hawker Hunter	F. Mk.6
1960	1962	Hawker Hunter	F. Mk.4
1961	1962	Hawker Hunter	F. Mk.6
1964	1980	Lockheed F-104 Starfighter	F-104G, TF-104G
1980	1998	General Dynamics F-16 Fighting Falcon	F-16A, F-16B Block 1/5/10/15/15 OCU
1998	2021	General Dynamics F-16 Fighting Falcon	F-16 MLU Block 15
2009	2021	General Dynamics F-16 Fighting Falcon	F-16 MLU Block 15 M5 update
2019	Present	Lockheed Martin F-35 Lightning II	F-35A

== Bibliography ==
- Hellferich, Willem. Squadrons van de Koninklijke Luchtmacht. Second printing. 1994. ISBN 90-9006841-4.
- Hellferich, Willem. 100 jaar Luchtmacht. De ontwikkeling van het luchtwapen bij de Koninklijke Luchtmacht van 1913 tot 2013. 2013. ISBN 978-90-809506-0-3.
- van den Heuvel, Coen. KLuNu 1991.
- de Jong, Kolonel A.P. Vlucht door de tijd 75 jaar Nederlandse Luchtmacht. 1988.
