= 303 (group) =

British girl group

- Origin: London, England
- Genres: R&B; pop
- Years active: 2017–2022
- Labels: Hot Spring Music; Caroline International
- Past members: Chloe Wealleans-Watts; Io Munro; Maddie Hinkley
- Website: theofficial303.com

303 were a British girl group based in London. The group comprised Chloe Wealleans-Watts, Io Munro and Maddie Hinkley. 303 were signed to independent record label Hot Spring Music.

== History ==
303 first came together after Munro and Hinkley, both Londoners, contacted Newcastle-based Wealleans-Watts. The group was founded on 30 March 2017, which inspired the name.

Their debut single, "Whisper", was premiered on 22 November 2018 on The Fader.

== Discography ==
=== Singles ===
- "Whisper" (2018)
- "Whisper" (acoustic) (2019)
- "Someone Else" (feat. Jamie) (2019)
- "Out Here" (2019)
- "Dreamin'" (2019)
- "Seasons" (2019)
- "Right This Time" (acoustic) (2020)
- "Downtime" (2020)
- "Mood" (2021)
- "Right This Time" (2021)
- "Real You" (2021)
- "Perfect on Paper" (2021)
- "Make Your Move" (2021)
- "Leaving" (2021)

=== Music videos ===
- "Whisper"
- "Whisper" (acoustic)
- "Someone Else"
- "Out Here"
- "Seasons"
