= Aircraft graveyard =

Storage area for aircraft that are retired from service

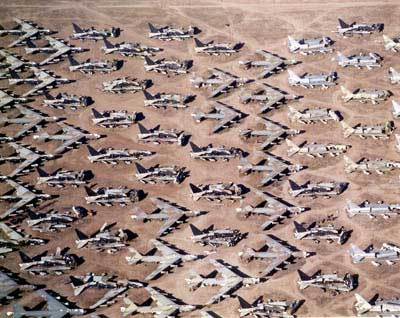
Boeing B-52s in storage or awaiting dismantlement at the 309th Aerospace Maintenance and Regeneration Group in Tucson, Arizona

An aircraft graveyard or aircraft boneyard is a storage area for aircraft which are retired from service. Most aircraft at boneyards are either kept for storage continuing to receive some maintenance or parts of the aircraft are removed for reuse or resale and the aircraft are scrapped. Boneyard facilities are generally located in deserts, such as those in the southwestern United States, since the dry conditions reduce corrosion and the hard ground does not need to be paved. In some cases, aircraft which were planned to be scrapped or were stored indefinitely without plans of ever returning to service were brought back into service, as the aviation market or the demands of military aviation changed or failed to develop as was anticipated.

Some yards are privately owned and operated, others belong to the military, including the 309th Aerospace Maintenance and Regeneration Group at Davis-Monthan Air Force Base in Tucson, Arizona.

After aircraft are put into boneyards, many are stripped of useful parts. Engines, as well as most electronics, munitions, and wiring to be removed, are recycled or kept in warehouses. The parts may serve as replacement parts for aircraft which are still flying or they may be used for reconditioning if and when the aircraft are called back into active duty. The parts along with the stripped aircraft may be sold to other countries.

Depending on the demands of the military or for commercial purposes, an aircraft or a whole squadron of the aircraft may be put back into active duty. The aircraft have to be reconditioned and tested so they will be airworthy. The reconditioning process includes putting in new avionics, electronics, safety measures, testing, and painting. Reconditioning of old aircraft is generally a cheaper way of getting more aircraft into service than buying new ones.

== Military aircraft ==
The 309th Aerospace Maintenance and Regeneration Group in Tucson, the largest facility of its kind, is colloquially known as "The Boneyard". Other nations' central aircraft storage facilities include the Russian Air Forces' Bases for Reserve Helicopters.

== Commercial aircraft ==
Due to the impact of the COVID-19 pandemic on commercial air transport, demand for commercial aircraft storage increased dramatically in 2020. Furthermore, many aircraft which had initially been planned for short-term storage were ultimately stored long term or even scrapped altogether, requiring maintenance work to prepare the planes for the different plans. As demand recovery behaved differently from expectations, temporary shortages as well as the requirement to prepare planes for long-term storage after a few months of short-term storage caused issues. Planes that have been stored for a few months can not be brought back to service on short notice. The longer planes are stored, the more time it takes to get them fully airworthy and ready to fly again. Bringing a narrowbody aircraft back from long-term storage takes roughly 40 worker hours while widebody aircraft require roughly 100 worker hours.

== Notable aircraft boneyards ==
Location	Country	Notes
Alice Springs, Northern Territory	Australia	First large-scale aircraft boneyard outside the United States.
Saskatoon, Saskatchewan	Canada	Contains 23 old Fokker F-28 Fellowships of Canadian Regional Airlines and Air Canada Jazz. Planes stored off service roads north of 09/27.
Mountainview, Ontario	Canada	Used primarily for storage of older RCAF Aircraft.
Manas International, Chüy Region	Kyrgyzstan	Soviet era aircraft began to appear after 1991.
Enschede Airport Twente	Netherlands	
Teruel, Aragon	Spain	
Ciudad Real International Airport, Ciudad Real	Spain	Used as a long-term aircraft storage site.
Lleida–Alguaire Airport, Lleida	Spain	
Tarbes, Hautes-Pyrénées	France	Major European hub for aircraft storage and recycling operated by Tarmac Aerosave, world-renowned for storing and dismantling a significant portion of the global Airbus A380 fleet.
Châteauroux-Centre "Marcel Dassault" Airport, Déols	France	Long-term aircraft storage for mostly Airbus aircraft.
St. Athan, Wales	United Kingdom	St. Athan Airfield, located near Barry in South Wales, is a major facility for the dismantling and recycling of retired commercial aircraft, operated by eCube Solutions.
Cotswold Airport (formerly Kemble Airfield), Gloucestershire	United Kingdom	Air Salvage International, the leading European aircraft decommissioning company.
RAF Shawbury, Shropshire	United Kingdom	From end of World War II to 1972.
Querétaro Intercontinental Airport, Querétaro	Mexico	Storage site for MD-80 series aircraft and more.
Toluca International Airport, Toluca	Mexico	Dozens of retired Interjet Yakovlev SJ-100s stored here.
Jinnah International Airport	Pakistan	Dozens of retired Shaheen Air aircraft are stored here.
Davis-Monthan AFB, Arizona	United States	Nearly 4,400 aircraft on 2,600-acre, 309th Aerospace Maintenance and Regeneration Group.
Tucson International Airport, Arizona	United States	Storage for Bombardier CRJ series aircraft.
Coolidge Municipal Airport, Arizona	United States	
Kingman Field, Arizona	United States	Storage and repair for Delta, American and United.
Pinal Airpark, Arizona	United States	
Miami–Opa Locka Executive Airport, Florida	United States	
Blytheville, Arkansas	United States	Storage and scrapping for retired aircraft including the MD-80 series aircraft.
San Bernardino, California	United States	Short-term aircraft storage and scrapping operations mainly for Delta Air Lines.
Birmingham–Shuttlesworth International Airport, Alabama	United States	Major aircraft storage site during the COVID-19 pandemic in 2020.
Mojave Air and Space, California	United States	More than 100 planes.
California City Municipal Airport, California	United States	Many retired private jets stored here.
Victorville, California	United States	
Oscoda-Wurtsmith, Michigan	United States	Storage for Kalitta Air and other airlines.
Greenwood-Leflore Airport, Mississippi	United States	Storage, modification and scrapping for retired aircraft.
Tupelo, Mississippi	United States	Storage, modification and scrapping for retired aircraft.
Roswell, New Mexico	United States	Several large passenger and cargo jets.
Laurinburg-Maxton, North Carolina	United States	Charlotte Aircraft Corporation strips former Northwest Airlines aircraft.
Madras Municipal Airport, Oregon	United States	Former Delta Air Lines MD-88s stored here as well as retired Douglas DC-7 Aerial firefighting aircraft.
Bob Sikes Airport, Florida	United States	Short-term storage operations.
Jenkins Airport, Delaware	United States	Tons of abandoned General Aviation aircraft.
Griffiss International Airport (Former), New York	United States	Retired Boeing 747 aircraft stored here.
Abilene Regional (Former), Texas	United States	Many retired Saab 340s mostly from Envoy Air-American Eagle.

== See also ==
- Aircraft Fleet Recycling Association
- Aircraft recycling
- PAMELA Project
- Ship graveyard
- Spacecraft cemetery
- Tarbes–Lourdes–Pyrénées Airport and Châteauroux-Centre "Marcel Dassault" Airport are also airports with aircraft boneyards
