= Aircraft recycling =

Recycling industry for aircraft

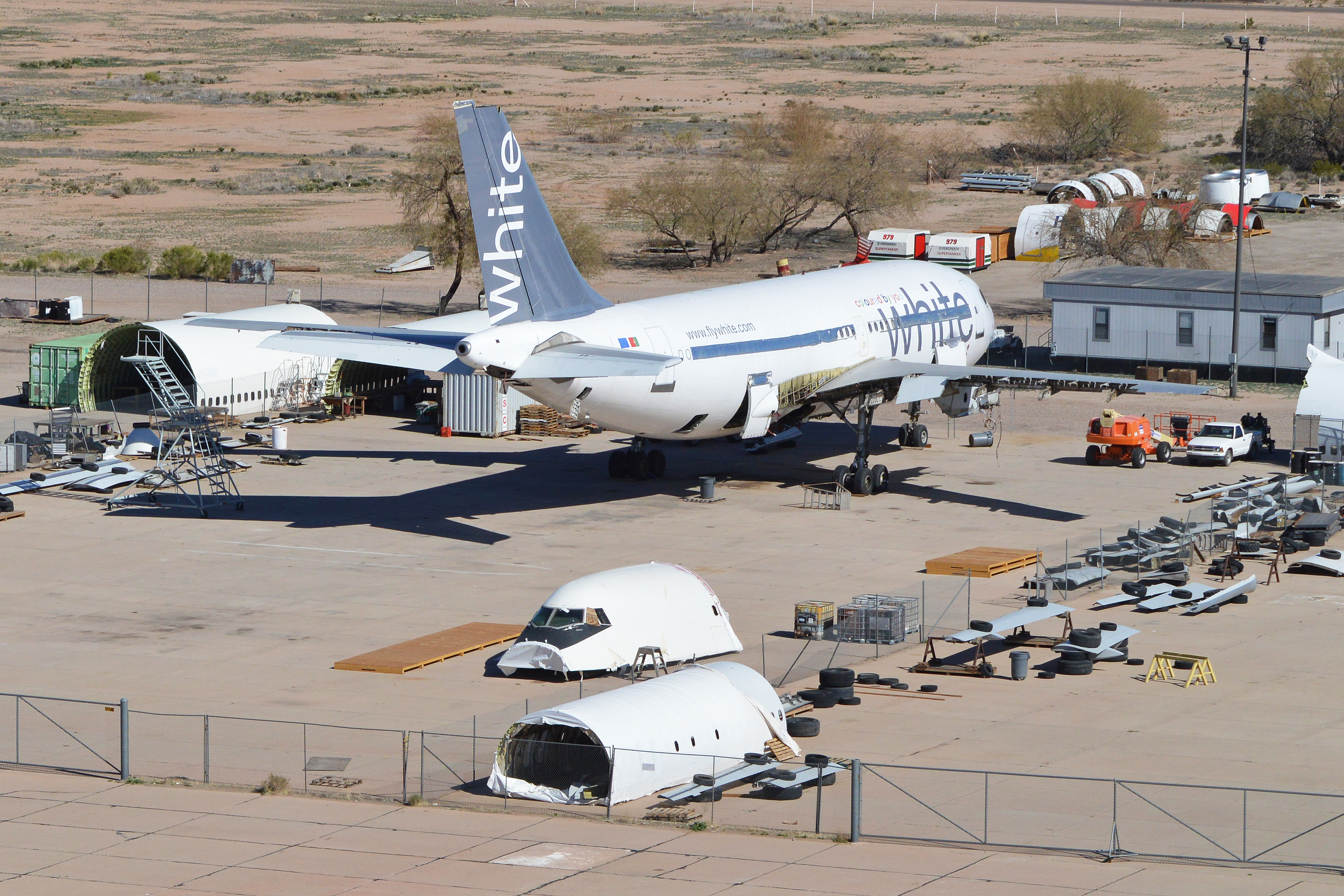
Airbus A310 being dismantled with the forward section of a Boeing 747 at Pinal Airpark

Aircraft recycling is the process of scrapping and disassembling retired aircraft, and re-purposing their parts as spare parts or scrap. Airplanes are made of around 800 to 1000 parts that can be recycled, with the majority of them made from metal alloys and composite materials. The two most common metal alloys are aluminum and titanium and the main composite material is carbon fiber.

Airplanes are disassembled at aircraft-recycling centers where non-metal components with no recycle value are discarded, major components are dismantled and metal alloy components are sorted based on their composition. The metal alloys are then remelted together to form a single homogenous alloy from scraps. It is estimated that roughly 400-450 airplanes are disassembled and recycled annually which drives the $2 billion aircraft parts market.

The main challenge in aircraft recycling is ensuring that the amount of metal impurities within recycled aircraft material is low so that they can be reused in other airplanes. Some major limitations in aircraft recycling include cost, impurities in alloys, hazardous materials, and the quality of recycled components. Parts that cannot be directly recycled can be reused or upcycled into artwork, clothing, and furniture.

== Background ==
In the twentieth century, most aircraft were not recycled; old planes were abandoned in landfills. In the early 2000s, Airbus and Boeing, two of the largest airplane manufacturing companies developed systematic recycling processes to deal with their retired planes and parts as an alternative to moving them to landfills.

In 2005, Airbus launched the project "Process for Advanced Management of End-of-Life of Aircraft" known as PAMELA, which demonstrated that 85% of an aircraft's weight can be recycled or reused. Airbus partnered with the waste management company, Suez-Sita and set-up a recycling facility at the Tarbes Airport. The project was tested on the Airbus A300 and was successfully completed when 61 tonnes of the original plane weight were recycled 32 months later in 2007. The project also created a standard for how to safely and responsibly deal with end-of-life airplanes that consisted of a three-step approach: decommissioning, disassembly and dismantling.

In 2006, Boeing founded the Aircraft Fleet Recycling Association, known as AFRA, to set up industry-wide guidelines for the dismantling and recycling of airplanes. The company joined forces with 10 others including Rolls-Royce, Europe Aviation, and Air Salvage International to create an industry code of conduct and collection of best practices. Together they formed a network of AFRA authorized recycling centers across the globe to deal with end-of-life planes in an environmentally friendly manner. AFRA has since grown, and as of 2022 consisted of 80 members which include stakeholders in all aspects of the aircraft recycling process from manufacturers to materials recyclers.

In 2013, Southwest Airlines created a recycling and community initiative, "Repurpose with Purpose," to upcycle the leather seat covers from their planes and provide economic opportunities for various vulnerable groups. The airline partnered with non-profit organizations that work with veterans, the disabled and victims of trafficking to turn the used leather into products such as soccer balls, shoes and jewelry. Since starting the program, over 900,000 pounds of leather have been recycled.

It is estimated that by 2040, about 44% of planes currently in the global fleet will retire from service; this will include over 13,000 commercial, military and private aircraft. In addition to an increase in recycled parts available from recent recycling efforts, blockchain technology has led to new ways in which recycled parts can be bought and sold. In 2019, Honeywell Aerospace introduced an online marketplace for aerospace parts called GoDirect Trade that uses blockchain to authenticate and trace the history of parts. The market for aircraft parts was valued at $5.4 billion in 2018 and is expected to grow to $7.7 billion by 2026.

However, during the COVID-19 pandemic, there was a decrease in the number of planes being scrapped and sent to junkyards. In 2020, 440 commercial jetliners were scrapped, which was a 15% decline from 2019. In 2021, the number continued to decrease another 30% from 2020. Additionally, the price of used planes decreased; before the pandemic, a used aircraft could be sold for $7–8 million, the price has since dropped to about $2 million. The decreased demand for used airplanes has resulted in lower prices.

== Raw materials ==
Retired aircraft have on average 800 to 1000 components that can be repurposed through recycling. The major aircraft materials to be recycled are metal alloys and composite materials.

=== Aluminum alloys ===
Aluminum alloys are used in aircraft structures, accounting for 80% of the aircraft's total weight. They are commonly used in the fuselage, wing, and supporting structure of aircraft because they are resistant to corrosion and have a good strength to weight ratio.

Aluminum that is used in aircraft is commonly mixed with copper, lithium, magnesium, manganese, silicon, silver, and zinc to form alloys. The composition ratio of each alloy is adjusted according to its intended use in order to meet specifications.

Aluminum alloys have the most expensive manufacturing cost for aircraft because their manufacturing process is energy-intensive. In order to obtain the aluminum to form the alloy, a smelting process must take place. Aluminum is extracted from bauxite, aluminum's main ore, through electrolysis, which requires a lot of energy; 211 MJ of energy are required to produce one kilogram of aluminum with electrolysis.

Recycling aluminum is cheaper than manufacturing the alloy because it requires only remelting the used scrap. The remelting process is achieved at a lower temperature than electrolysis and therefore the process requires less energy, which lowers the cost.

The recycled aluminum alloys can be used in aircraft parts such as stiffeners and flaps, where a growth in fatigue stress and fracture toughness are not critical to the component's integrity. The alloys can also be used for non-aircraft applications, such as truck bodies, rivets, auto bumpers, and castings.

=== Titanium alloys ===
Titanium alloys are commonly used in the aircraft industry because they are strong and highly resistant to corrosion and heat. In comparison to aluminum, titanium is heavier but stronger, so less of it is required to form structural components, which reduces the overall weight and diminishes the in-flight energy consumption.

Despite its natural abundance, titanium supply is limited when compared to other metals. The smelting process for titanium uses more energy than that of aluminum, consuming 361 MJ of energy for every kilogram of titanium produced.

The recycling of titanium utilizes the scraps from the manufacturing process. These scraps are cleaned to remove oxygen and iron impurities and then remelted.

=== Composite materials ===
Composite materials are used to lower the weight of aircraft because they are lighter than traditional metal materials such as aluminum. They also have high fatigue strength (longer life cycle) and good corrosion and fire resistance. In order to decrease the weight of aircraft, manufacturers incorporate more composite materials to the structure. The lighter weight leads to improved fuel economy, which in turn reduces operational costs for airlines.

A major component of composite materials is carbon fiber. If the carbon fiber is recycled, it does not lose its mechanical properties, which can be potentially used for the following applications: structural, acoustic and thermal insulation, and air and liquid filtration. Recycled carbon fibers are valued at up to $50 per pound of material.

The recycling of composite materials is more challenging than metal alloys because the industry has yet to develop methods to reuse the individual components that make up the material. A large portion of the composite materials become waste as aircraft are retired and disassembled.

== Recycling process ==
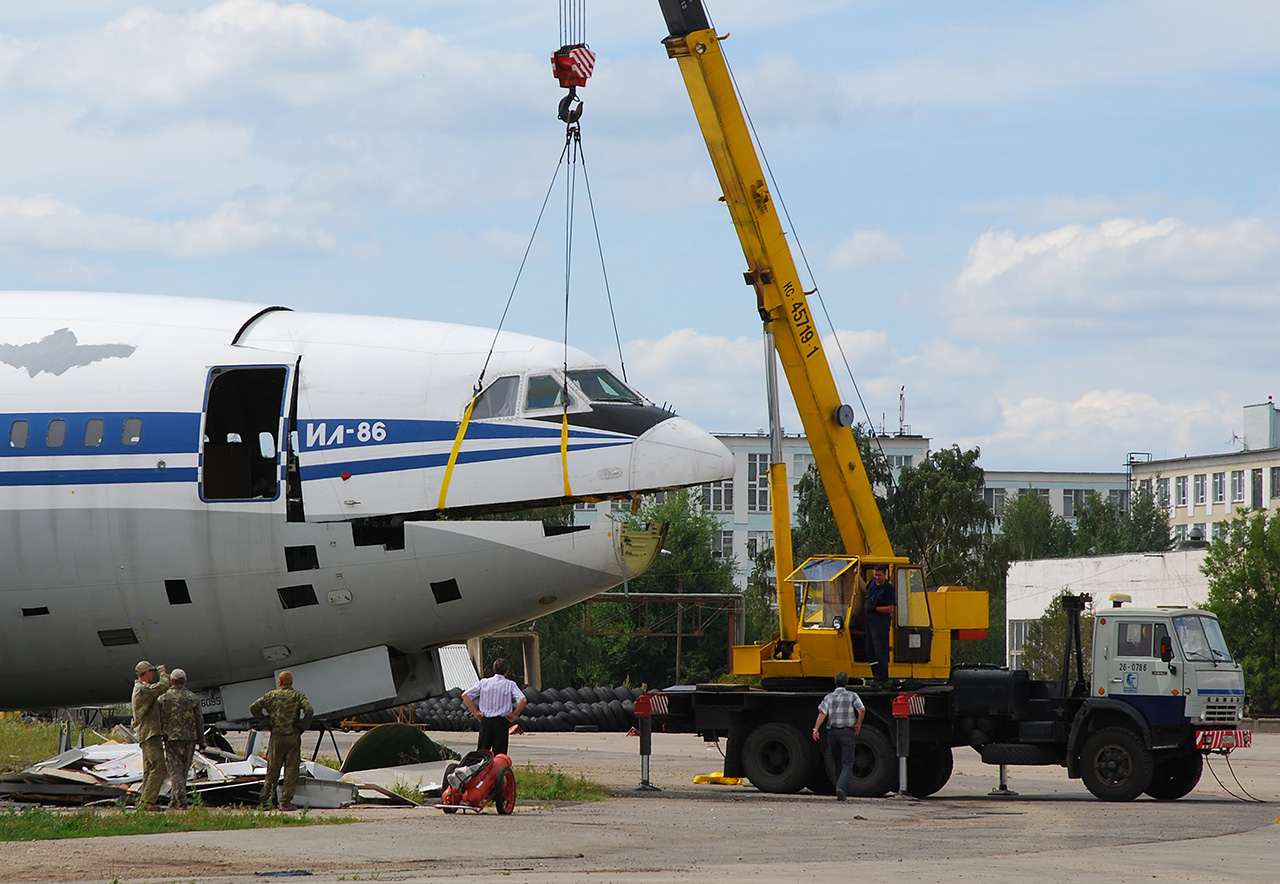
Ilyushin Il-86 cut at Sheremetyevo Airport

The recycling process must ensure that there are low amounts of metal impurities within recycled aircraft components. As recycled components need to meet required specifications when implemented into other aircraft, recycled components (particularly metal alloys) must be organized properly to secure successful processing. First, an aircraft is transported to an aircraft-recycling center where it is disassembled. Desert conditions are ideal for storage because low humidity is required to maintain the condition of the aircraft. The aircraft is drained of fuel, washed to remove corrosive salt, and lubricated.

Explosive devices from the evacuation slides are removed, air ducts are sealed, and a protective layer of paint is applied. Non-metal components with no recycling value are discarded and the major areas of the aircraft are dismantled. Alloy components are organized based on their metallurgical composition, and then integrated as desired into alloying new metals.

Alloying involves the gathering of scrap metal with different properties to be re-melted together to make a single homogenous alloy. The majority of alloys used in aircraft are either 2xxx (Al-Cu-Mn) or 7xxx (Al-Zn-Mg) series steels. When secondary alloying elements are found in excess of 10% within a steel alloy, the properties of the steel are especially valuable for recycling into aircraft use. Oftentimes, different alloys are implemented into different components of the aircraft which allows for clearer steel separation.

Components such as landing gears, tail sections, flaps, wings, and fuselages are composed primarily of either 2xxx or 7xxx series steels, and are separated upon aircraft deconstruction. Seats can be worth up to $5000 and an aircraft landing gear can be sold for upwards of $1M. Cables, batteries and other electronic waste are fed into the conventional recycling chains. As plastic interior components often contain flame retardant chemicals, they are not recyclable. Even though recycled metal does not fulfill very high alloy specifications for properties such as toughness, recycled component metal can still be integrated into melting stock: a stock of different metals which are then melted together.

Before recycled metal is introduced into metal stocks for alloying, additional processing is sometimes required for contaminant removal. Elemental residue is a major concern when considering the recycling of aircraft steel because it cannot safely be introduced into repurposed steels. Though plastics have often not been recyclable due to flame retardant chemical use, new methods are being developed to recycle these plastics effectively. Allred and Salas (2005) conducted research in 2005 on a catalytic conversion process at low temperatures to convert rubber, thermosets, and thermoplastics into usable hydrocarbon byproducts. This process was shown to reduce hazardous substance presence by 80%. Other inorganic residues such as heavy metals and oxides can be re-melted to eliminate their toxicity. For large metal components that constitute the body of the aircraft, shredding is required before the resulting metal scraps can be introduced into melting stock.

Carbon fibers are among the most common non-metal materials recycled from aircraft. Recycled carbon fibers do not experience any mechanical degradation and can consequently be reinforced into plastics, polymers, or glass to form composite materials. Recycled fiber can be cut to specified lengths before being integrated into these materials: providing a large amount of flexibility in meeting reuse specifications.

An airliner can be dismantled in 1,500-2,000 parts (1,000 or so LRUs) in 30–60 days including engines, landing gear, auxiliary power units and components but it can be parked a year or two to maximize the part harvesting. A metal aircraft can be recycled for up to 85-90% by mass, and can be maintained for composite airframes as the industry adapts with a growing carbon fiber market.

=== Storage ===
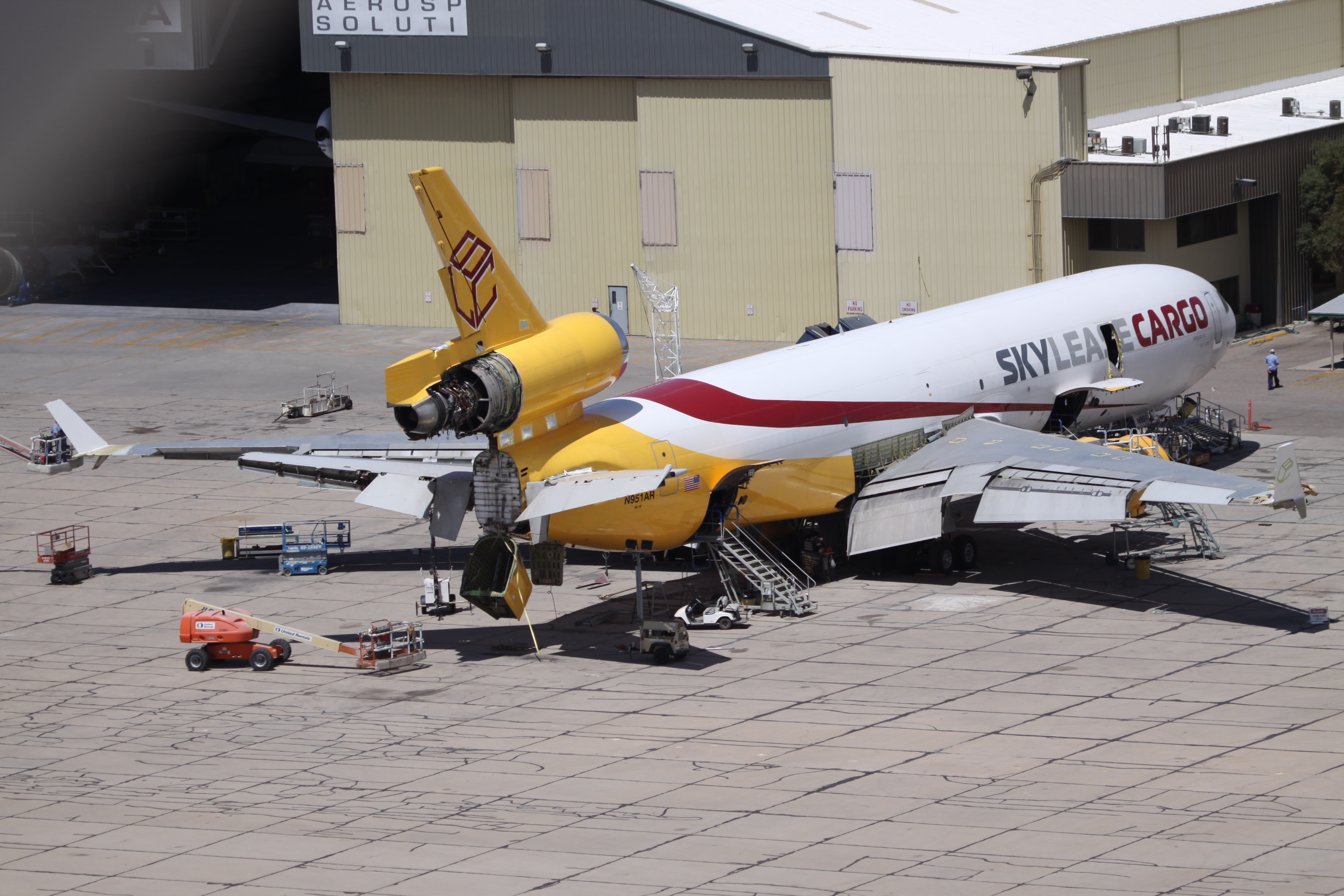
McDonnell Douglas MD-11 N951AR (ex…B-2171) part out

The aircraft lessor Avolon counted a total of 2,100 aircraft in storage during 2017. Of these, 48% were deemed unsuitable for future flight, making them viable candidates for aircraft recycling. Aircraft that have been parked for three years have a 50% likelihood of being redeployed for flight, and a 20% likelihood after five years of storage. Even though the global jet transport statistics are expected to double over the next 20 years (as of 2013) with 43,000 new deliveries and 16,000 retirements projected through 2037, the total count of aircraft in storage is expected to remain constant during this time.

The peak of airplane retirement occurred in 2013 with a total of 700 retirements. Strong demand for aircraft from 2013 to 2016 caused annual retirement to decrease to roughly 500 retirements. Decommissions were totaled at 505 retirements in 2018, increased to 2,200 aircraft in 2020, and were totaled at 3,900 aircraft in 2022 by the Jefferies company forecast.

=== Recycling market ===
The aircraft disassembly and recycling industries are responsible for a $2 billion annual market in aircraft part sales. It is estimated that between roughly 400 and 450 aircraft are disassembled annually, and it is believed that 12,500 aircraft will be retired between 2009 and 2029. The majority of retired planes that are intended for recycling can be found in the Davis-Monthan Air Force Base in Tucson, Arizona. Davis-Monthan is responsible for storing at least 4,400 retired aircraft. Its neighbor, the Mojave Air and Space Port, stores upwards of 1000 civilian aircraft. There are multiple international platforms that contribute to the aircraft recycling sector that are owned by companies such as Bartin Aero Recycling in France, Air Salvage International in the United Kingdom, and Airbus in Tarbes Airport. The latter of these locations is a designated research facility for aircraft recycling as part of the PAMELA Project.

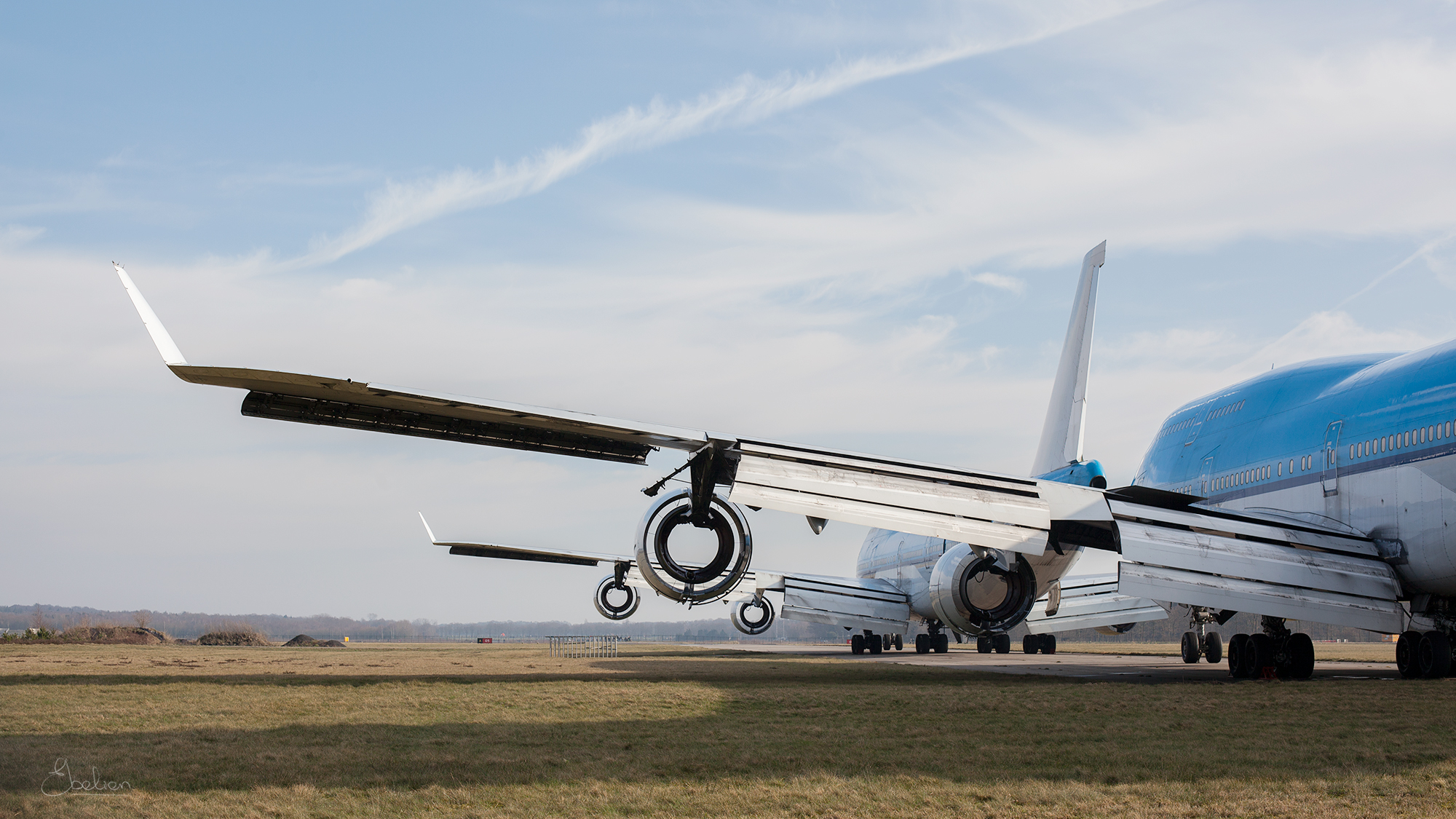
Two KLM Boeing 747s being dismantled at Enschede Airport Twente, February 2018

A 2019 publication shows that the majority of aircraft under the jurisdiction of Airbus are smaller, narrow-body planes while wide-body aircraft only constitutes 31% of Airbus' total retired fleet. The fleet is 58% narrow-body Boeing Series airplanes, 29% McDonnell Douglas MD-80s, and 12% Airbus A340's. Boeing 777 series airplanes made up 40% of the wide-body aircraft. As the popularity of commercial flight and aircraft use increases, the retirement phase for an aircraft becomes longer while the demand for recycled components goes up. This pattern raises the market price for recycled components and increases the profit that the aircraft recycling industry is able to acquire.

AFRA (Aircraft Fleet Recycling Association) is the single organization with the largest stake in the aircraft recycling industry. Since 2009, AFRA has taken part in roughly one-third of all aircraft disassembly operations annually. AFRA operates internationally and seeks to promote environmentally-sustainable standards into aircraft disassembly and recycling procedures.

== Impacts ==
=== Efficacy ===
Recycled planes are estimated to be worth between $1 and $3 million in parts with nearly 80% of the value coming from the airplane's engine. Other parts such as the auxiliary power unit and landing gear are either recertified and sold second hand, or reused as spare parts by the airline company. Remaining parts made of non-metal materials, including plastics and fabrics, are sent to recycling centers.

With newer aircraft like the Boeing 787 Dreamliner being made of nearly 50% composites, there have been developments in the recycling process for these materials through mechanical recycling, fluidized bed process, pyrolysis, or solvolysis. Mechanical recycling involves shredding the composites and using them as filler for other lower grade applications, yet this is limited to glass fiber composites like fiberglass. The fluidized bed process burns the composite materials and uses the heat to generate electricity. The matrix of the composite is also burned away leaving only the clean fibers that can be extracted out of the system. This recycling process has the ability to separate metals from carbon fiber while also coping with mixed composite materials; however, the process requires large amounts of hot air, and it leads to a slight change in fiber properties. Pyrolysis takes the carbon and heats the composites without oxygen present to detach the matrix and leaves only the fiber material; the process produces carbon dioxide or methane. Pyrolysis can also be used to create fuel from the composites which can be burned to produce energy. Solvolysis utilizes a solvent to break down the chemical bonds of the matrix, leaving behind the carbon fiber or other fiber material. Recycled composites have a more limited use as they cannot be used in critical components due to the difficulty in re-weaving recycled fibers and the decrease in fiber length that typically occurs during recycling.

Parts that can not be directly recycled can be reused or upcycled into artwork, clothing, or furniture. For example, the company SkyArt takes composite and mixed plastics, which would typically end up in a landfill, and recycles them into aircraft simulators and other furniture.

=== Environment ===
Recycling parts from airplanes requires less energy than producing primary parts because manufacturing processes for materials such as aluminum and steel are energy intensive. Recycling in turn leads to a decrease in global greenhouse gas emissions. For example, recycling aluminum requires 95% less energy than producing virgin aluminum (non-recycled).

However, when composites are recycled, the process must be done with the proper care to avoid environmental and safety issues. Certain composites can be classified as hazardous waste depending on the chemicals that coat them such as hexavalent chromium so extra precautions must be made when recycling these materials. Additionally, if a composite is carbon fiber, precautions must be taken when melting the material for recycling to avoid the release of electrically conductive fibers that can cause electrical interference in devices.

== Limitations ==
Limitations in recycling aircraft materials include cost, impurities in alloys, hazardous materials, and quality of recycled components. The aircraft recycling industry is challenged by the dispersed location of recycling centers, and the cost associated with transporting recycled metals from remote locations. Variations in the market price of recycled aluminum also affect the profitability of recycling sites.

=== Aluminum ===
Extracting aluminum from airplanes is difficult because aircraft compounds typically contain relatively high amounts of mixed metal alloys and new aircraft generally need aluminum with lower levels of impurities. Additionally, the variety of aluminum alloys that have good performance and can be produced directly from recycled aluminum is limited. Another limitation for recycling aluminum for aircraft is a lack of automation in the recycling process. Safely dealing with hazardous materials when recycling aircraft poses further operational challenges. Hazardous materials are more likely to be found in old aircraft which may contain substances such as asbestos, hexavalent chromium (found in paint primer) and halon 1301 (found in fire extinguishers). The presence of lithium with aluminum, found in some aircraft alloys, is dangerous as it can explode when the scrap aluminum is remelted.

=== Composite materials ===
The primary challenges for recycling composite materials are high cost, weaknesses in the physical properties of recycled composites, and the lack of demand for recycled composites. Carbon fiber is a composite material that is currently not widely recycled. With the current processes in place, it is difficult to sort through composite materials before recycling can occur. This is especially the case with metal that is intertwined in composite pieces. The carbon fiber that is recycled is generally not turned into subsequent carbon fiber products, instead being used for applications such as cheap filler material.

== See also ==
- Aircraft boneyard
- Airliner
- Aluminium recycling
