= AerSale =

Aviation Company

Coordinates: 41.987373°N 87.981812°W

AerSale, Inc.
- Type: Public
- Traded as: Nasdaq: ASLE
- Industry: Aviation; Aerospace and defense
- Founded: 2008
- Founders: Nicolas Finazzo and Robert B. Nichols
- Headquarters: Doral, Florida, U.S.
- Area served: Worldwide
- Key people: Nicolas Finazzo (Chairman & CEO); Martin Garmendia (CFO); Ben Tschirhart (Head of Engineered Solutions); Craig Wright (Head of Aircraft & Engine Management); Iso Nezaj (Chief Product Development Officer); Gary Jones (Head of Materials Group & COO); Enrique Pizzi (CIO)
- Revenue: ▼US$335 million (2025)
- Net income: ▲US$8.57 million (2025)
- Website: www.aersale.com

AerSale, Inc. is a Doral, Florida-based global supplier of aftermarket commercial jet aircraft, engines, used materials, and aeronautical engineering services to passenger and cargo airlines, government, multinational original equipment manufacturers, and independent MROs. AerSale is a member of the Aircraft Fleet Recycling Association.

== History ==
The company was founded in Coral Gables, Florida, in 2008. The two founders invested US$250 million in equity in January 2010.

In July 2010, AerSale delivered a specially modified Boeing 737-400 aircraft to the National Nuclear Security Administration to fly depleted nuclear waste to disposal sites. It supplied low-cost, used turbine blades to the Department of Defense for use on the Air Force's KC-135 Stratotanker aircraft; it saved the government US$36 million.

== Lines of business ==
AerSale operates three integrated lines of business: Aircraft & Engine Leasing; Material Sales; and Maintenance, Repair & Overhaul (MRO). The company is an aftermarket seller of original equipment manufacturers (OEM) used serviceable material.

AerSale sells and leases engines and aircraft, both commercial passenger and cargo aircraft. It has purchased Boeing 737-300, Boeing 737-400, Boeing 737-500, Boeing 747-400, Boeing 757-200, and Boeing 767-300 passenger and freighter aircraft; Airbus A300-600R, Airbus A310-200, Airbus A320-200, and Airbus A330-300 passenger aircraft; and McDonnell Douglas MD-90 passenger and McDonnell Douglas DC-8-70 series freighter aircraft.

In November 2013, it completed a major maintenance check for NASA on its flying laboratory, a specially modified McDonnell Douglas DC-8-70 series aircraft.

== Certifications ==
On March 12, 2010, the Aviation Suppliers Association certified AerSale's quality system to meet the requirements of ASA-100 and FAA Advisory Circular 00-56A. On June 14, 2011, AerSale was certified by the Aircraft Fleet Recycling Association. On February 24, 2014, it received a U.S. Approval Certificate from the European Aviation Safety Agency (EASA).

In December 2023, the FAA approved the AerAware headset device SKYLENS as part of an enhanced flight vision system.

== Acquisitions ==
AerSale's first acquisition came in 2009 when it acquired 44 McDonnell Douglas DC-8-70 series aircraft from a major international logistics company.

In May 2010, AerSale acquired the assets of Great Southwest Aviation located at the Roswell International Air Center in Roswell, New Mexico. In late 2010, AerSale acquired 19 Boeing 747-400 aircraft from Japan Airlines, representing two-thirds of the JAL fleet of 747-400s. In 2012, AerSale acquired 25 of Saudi Airlines's McDonnell Douglas MD-90 aircraft. In July 2015, AerSale acquired Aero Mechanical Industries, Inc. (AMI), located in Rio Rancho, New Mexico, to expand its component overhaul services to include aero structures. In 2018, AMI was rebranded AerSale Component Solutions.

In November 2018, AerSale acquired Avborne, located in Miami, Florida, to include overhaul capability for hydraulic, pneumatic, and landing gear. In June 2019, AerSale acquired airframe parts specialist Qwest Air Parts to add scale to its offering of airframe used serviceable material.

AerSale Corp. and Monocle Acquisition Corporation announced their merger in December 2019, with an implied enterprise value of about US$430 million. The deal was revised in September 2020, with a lower value of about US$300 million. The combined company, named AerSale Corporation, began trading on Nasdaq under the ticker symbol "ASLE" in December 2020.
