= Flight 153 =

Flight 153 may refer to:

- Caledonian Airways Flight 153, crashed on 4 March 1962
- Gulfstream Aerospace Flight 153, crashed on 2 April 2011
