= Aircraft End-of-Life Solutions =

Aircraft company

Coordinates: 52.2812°N 6.890°E

Aircraft End-of-Life Solutions AELS
- Type: Private limited company
- Industry: Recycling
- Founded: 2006
- Headquarters: Twente Airport, Enschede, Netherlands
- Area served: Worldwide
- Key people: Johan Vlastuin (CEO), Derk-Jan van Heerden (Founder)
- Website: aels.com

Aircraft End-of-Life Solutions (AELS) B.V. is a company that disassembles and dismantles aircraft that are out of service or retired. The company is situated at Twente Airport, in Enschede, Netherlands and has the ability to disassemble and dismantle aircraft worldwide.

The processes of AELS have been accredited by the Aircraft Fleet Recycling Association in April 2010.
