= Charlotte Aircraft Corporation =

- Type: Corporation
- Industry: Aviation
- Founded: 1953
- Headquarters: Delta Airbase, Charlotte, North Carolina, United States
- Key people: Jenks Caldwell, Jr; President
- Products: Reconditioned aircraft parts
- Website: www.charlotteaircraft.com

Charlotte Aircraft Corporation is a company headquartered in Charlotte, North Carolina, which deals in used aircraft and aircraft parts. The company was founded by Jenks Caldwell Sr. in 1953. Today the company is run by his son Jenks Caldwell Jr. The company's main business is reselling refurbished aircraft parts which it acquires by purchasing used aircraft and stripping them of their useful parts, storing them until required, and re-furbishing them before sale to the customer.

The company also has a history of engine modification. In the 1950s the company refitted Wright R-2600 engines for the DC-4.

== Locations ==
- Headquarters: Delta Airbase, Charlotte, North Carolina (35°12′48″N 080°43′23.53″W): Sometime in the late 1950s the company acquired Delta Airbase, an airfield located off WT Harris Blvd in Charlotte, NC and moved it operations there from Charlotte Douglas Airport. Delta Airbase was created by some people from the Mississippi Delta area who moved to Charlotte to establish an airfield and operation to train pilots during World War II (hence the name Delta Airbase). In the 1960s the company purchased a large number of ex-Eastern Airlines DC-6s & DC-7s. These were flown into Delta Airbase and parted out. Between January 1993 and March 1998 the airstrip was shortened and some of the land was used to develop an apartment complex. In June 1996 the company filed for a change of address from the Delta Airbase location to the Maxton location. Between January and April 2021 the property was fully demolished and has since been developed into apartments.
- Laurinburg-Maxton Airport (34°47′31″N 079°21′57″W): The company has a sizable operation at Laurinburg-Maxtion Airport where it flies in aircraft and reduces them to parts. Aircraft such as 747s, 737s, 727s, DC-10 and DC-9s are visible from perimeter roads in various stages of stripping of usable parts.

== Museum and Film aircraft ==
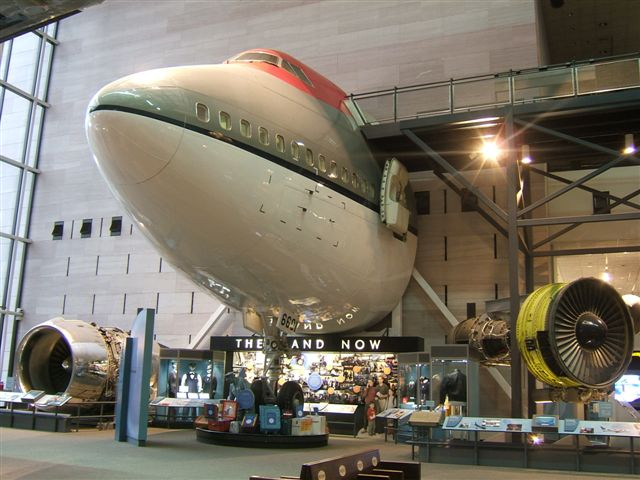
First 747 purchased by Northwest Airlines. Aircraft came from Charlotte Aircraft Corp.'s facility in Maxton, North Carolina

In 2006, the forward fuselage of the first 747 purchased by Northwest Airlines was removed from the airplane at Maxton and taken and installed in the National Air and Space Museum in Washington, D.C.

A Boeing 727 aircraft was trucked from Maxton to Massachusetts for use in the Tom Cruise movie Knight and Day.
