= Aérocentre (cluster) =

French cluster of aerospace engineering companies

Coordinates: 47°N 2°E

Aérocentre is a French cluster of aerospace engineering companies and research centres created in 2009. It is in the region of Centre-Val de Loire in the middle of France.

== Overview ==
There are over 321 companies. About 20,000 people work there in the aviation and space flight industries.

The headquarters of Aérocentre is located at the Châteauroux-Centre "Marcel Dassault" Airport. The chairman of the cluster is Jean-Michel SANCHEZ.

== Partners ==
- Agence régionale pour l'innovation
- Groupe Banque Populaire
- Airemploi
- Centre d'études supérieures industrielles of Orléans
- Électricité de France
- Institut Polytechnique des Sciences Avancées
