= No. 322 (Dutch) Squadron RAF =

Squadron of the Royal Air Force during WWII

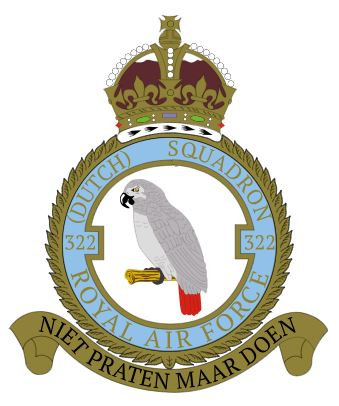
- Active: 12 June 1943 – 7 October 1945
- Country: United Kingdom
- Allegiance: (Netherlands) Dutch government in exile
- Branch: Royal Air Force
- Type: Inactive
- Role: Fighter squadron
- Mottos: Dutch: Niet praten maar doen ("Actions, not words" or "Don't prattle, act")
- Mascots: Polly Grey, the parrot
- Equipment: Spitfire

Commanders
- Notable commanders: Bram van der Stok

Insignia
- Squadron badge: Perched on a Branch, a Parrot
- Squadron codes: VL Jun 1943 – Jul 1944 (Code taken over from No. 167 Squadron); 3W (Jul 1944 – Oct 1945)

No. 322 (Dutch) Squadron of the Royal Air Force was a fighter squadron during the Second World War.

Formed with Dutch personnel already flying with the RAF, during the war it formed part of the Air Defence of Great Britain and formed part of the defences against V-1 flying bombs. In the last year of the war, it moved to the continent. After the war, it was disbanded as an RAF unit, but the 322e Jachtvliegtuig Afdeling of the Netherlands armed forces was formed from the squadron.

== History ==
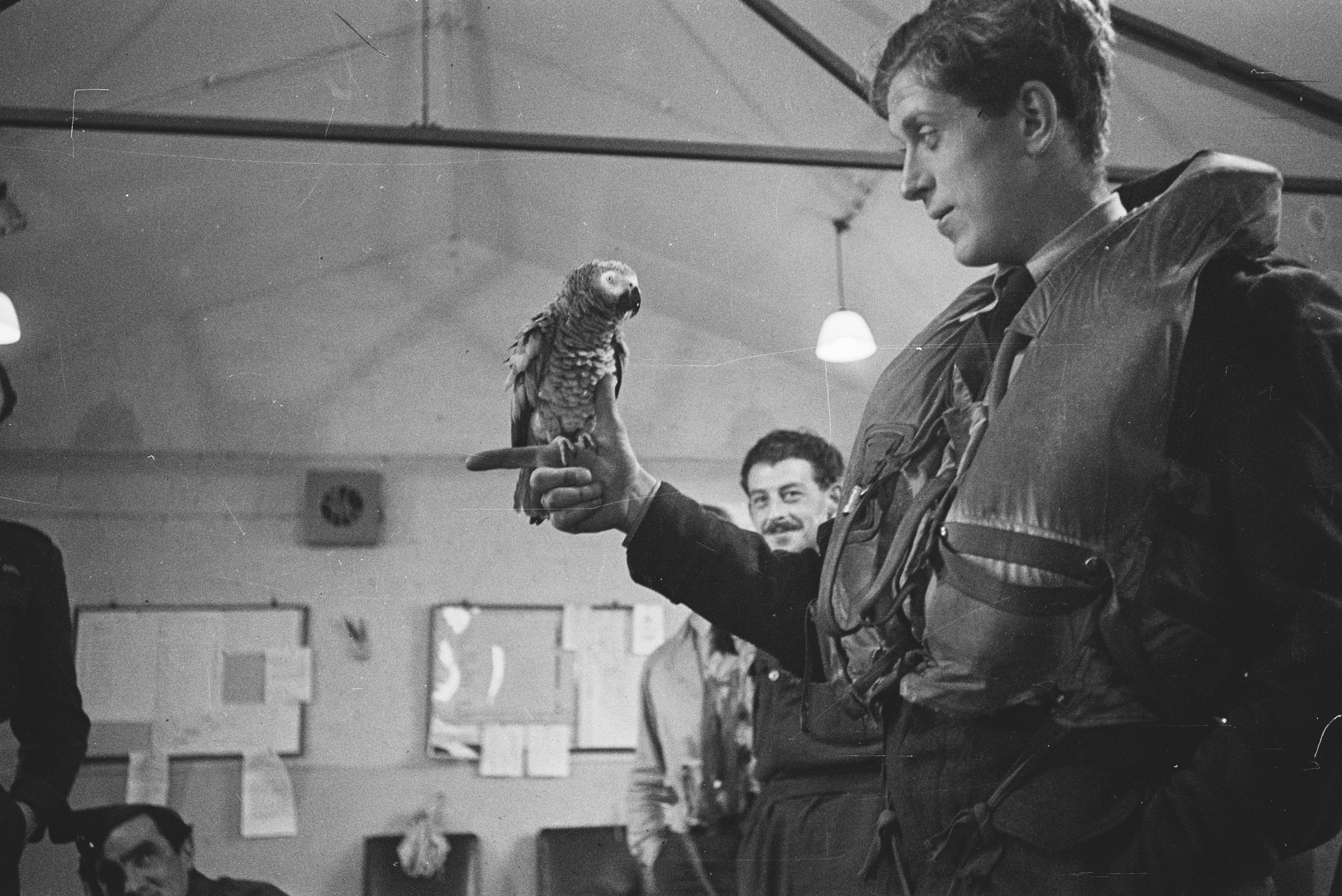
Squadron mascot "Polly Grey"

No. 322 Squadron of the Royal Air Force was formed from the Dutch personnel of No. 167 Squadron RAF on 12 June 1943 at RAF Woodvale. The squadron retained the code-letter combination VL which had been used previously by No. 167 Squadron until late June 1944, when it was changed to 3W. It served at RAF West Malling and other stations during the Second World War.

From 20 June to 9 August 1944, and equipped with Spitfire Mk XIVs, the squadron was tasked with intercepting the V-1 Flying Bomb "doodlebug" missiles launched from the Dutch and French coasts towards London. Flying Officer Rudy Burgwal was the most outstanding pilot on these 'anti-diver' patrols, claiming five of the missiles in one 90 minute flight on 8 July 1944. The total for the squadron was 108.5 destroyed.

On 7 October 1945, the squadron disbanded at Wunstorf in Germany as part of the RAF. In recognition of the squadron's wartime record, the squadron was reestablished at Twente Airbase on 27 September 1946 as the 322e Jachtvliegtuig Afdeling (Fighter Division) of the Royal Netherlands Army.

The Dutch No. 322 Squadron RNLAF is officially considered as the continuation of No. 322 (Dutch) Squadron, keeping its motto, coat of arms, and mascot "Polly Grey", the parrot.

== Aircraft operated ==
From	To	Aircraft	Version
June 1943	March 1944	Supermarine Spitfire	Vb, Vc
March 1944	August 1944	Supermarine Spitfire	XIV
August 1944	November 1944	Supermarine Spitfire	IXb
November 1944	October 1945	Supermarine Spitfire	XVIe

== Commanding officers ==
From	To	Name
June 1943	August 1943	S/Ldr. Archibald Cathcart Stewart, DFC
September 1943	September 1944	Maj. K.C. Kuhlmann, DFC
September 1944	November 1944	S/Ldr. L.C.M. van Eendenburg
November 1944	March 1945	S/Ldr. H.F. O'Neill, DFC
March 1945	October 1945	S/Ldr. Bram "Bob" van der Stok

== Squadron bases ==
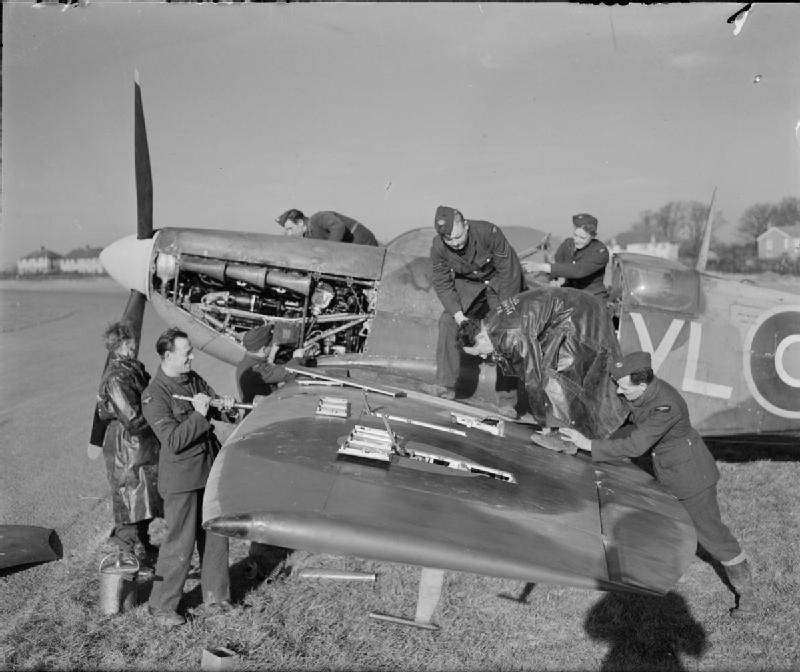
Ground crew service a Spitfire Mark VB of No. 322 (Dutch) Squadron at RAF Hawkinge, February 1944.

From	To	Base
12 June 1943	15 November 1943	RAF Woodvale
15 November 1943	30 November 1943	RAF Llanbedr
30 November 1943	31 December 1943	RAF Woodvale
31 December 1943	25 February 1944	RAF Hawkinge
25 February 1944	1 March 1944	RAF Ayr
1 March 1944	9 March 1944	RAF Hawkinge
9 March 1944	23 April 1944	RAF Acklington
23 April 1944	20 June 1944	RAF Hartford Bridge
20 June 1944	21 July 1944	RAF West Malling
21 July 1944	10 October 1944	RAF Deanland
10 October 1944	1 November 1944	RAF Fairwood Common
1 November 1944	3 January 1945	RAF Biggin Hill
3 January 1945	21 February 1945	RAF Woensdrecht (B.79)
21 February 1945	18 April 1945	RAF Schijndel (B.85)
18 April 1945	30 April 1945	RAF Twente (B.106)
30 April 1945	2 July 1945	RAF Varrelbusch (B.113)
2 July 1945	7 October 1945	RAF Wunstorf (B.116)

== See also ==
- List of Royal Air Force aircraft squadrons
- Royal Netherlands Air Force
