= PAMELA Project =

The Process for Advanced Management of End-of-Life Aircraft (PAMELA) Project, initiated in 2006, is an enterprise set up by Airbus at Tarbes Airport in Southern France, with the aim of recycling aircraft parts. The project was initially supported by the European Commission; they later partnered with the waste management company SITA, Sogerma Services and EADS CCR.

== Goal ==
The project's ultimate goal is protecting the environment. Instead of letting old passenger aircraft deteriorate in airport perimeters or in "boneyards", aircraft will be decommissioned and recycled.

Airbus estimates that more than 4,000 aircraft will finish active service between 2004 and 2023, a rate of over 200 aircraft per year, and that between 85% and 95% of their components can easily be recycled, reused, or otherwise recovered.
