= Kees van Eendenburg =

Dutch military pilot (1914–1966)

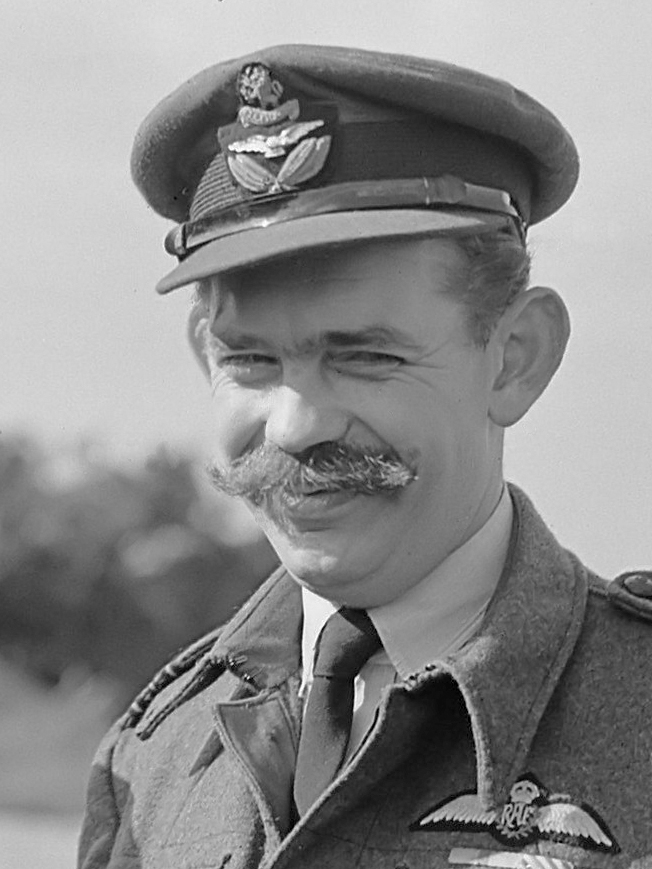
- Kees van Eendenburg (1944)
- Born: 29 December 1914; Batavia, Dutch East Indies
- Died: 4 September 1966 (aged 51)
- Military career
- Allegiance: Netherlands; Dutch government-in-exile
- Branch: Royal Netherlands Air Force; Royal Air Force
- Service years: 1940–1945
- Rank: Reserve-Majoor-Vlieger
- Unit: No. 322 (Dutch) Squadron RAF
- Commands: No. 322 (Dutch) Squadron RAF (September–November 1944)

Interview on Radio Oranje, 17 February 1941

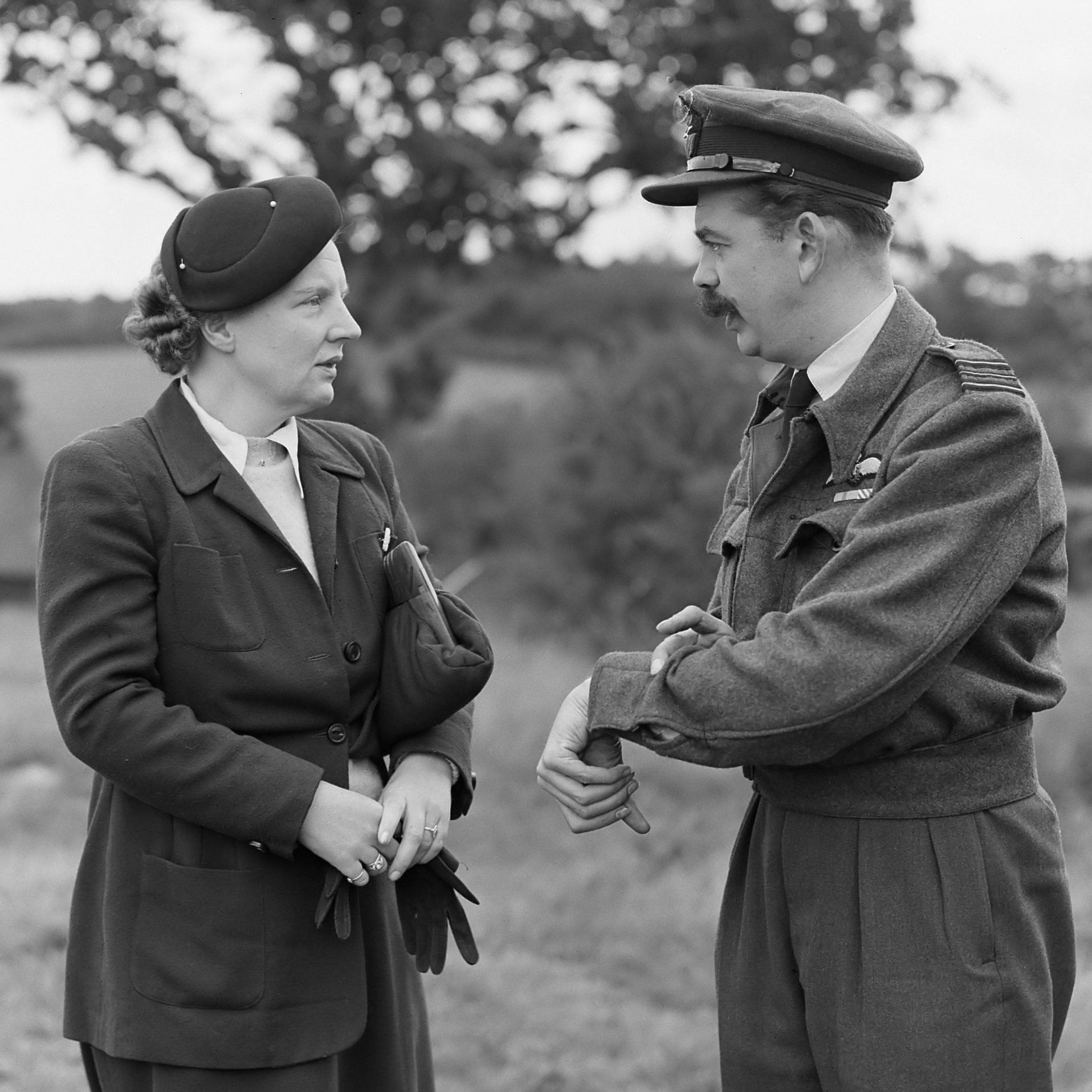
Kees van Eendenburg with Juliana of the Netherlands in 1944

Leendert Carel Marie van Eendenburg (29 December 1914 – 4 September 1966) was a Dutch military pilot.

== Life ==
Van Eendenburg was born in Batavia in the Dutch East Indies and studied at the University of Leiden before the outbreak of World War II. Eight weeks after Germany occupied the Netherlands in 1940 he and Karel Michielsen (a rower at KSRV Njord, a swimming association at the University) decided to escape to the United Kingdom. Van Eendenburg had a 12-foot motorless gig, named De Bebèk (the duck), which they brought from the Kaag to the beach near his home in Oegstgeest using a horse and cart. Friends living on the boulevard stored water and life-jackets ready for the voyage and just before the crossing they were joined by a third man Fred Vas Nunes. The first major obstacle would be the surf but the escapees had practiced getting through it in swimming trunks in full sight of the Germans.

The date for the escape was set as 5 July 1940. The weather was bad on that day but news came through that there were no other ships on the beach and so the three men stuck to the date. Boats were banned on the beach, but they informed the Germans that they were taking the gig to Scheveningen and were allowed to sail it away. By the time the Germans noticed that the gig was not heading for Scheveningen, it was out of range of their guns. Two days later it reached the British coast, the first Dutch party to do so successfully. The three men were received at Roehampton Park by Queen Wilhelmina, who awarded them all the Bronze Cross without consulting the Dutch government-in-exile. Radio Oranje also announced that "the duck has arrived", a coded reference to the successful crossing.

Van Eendenburg joined No. 322 (Dutch) Squadron RAF, equipped with the Supermarine Spitfire. On 1 September 1944 Squadron Leader K C Kuhlmann, Flight Commander Jan Leendert Plesman (1919–1944) and Van Eendenburg took off on an armed reconnaissance flight. After attacking several ground targets, Kuhlmann was shot down (probably by anti-aircraft fire) and captured. Plesman was shot down and killed. Van Eendenburg's plane was heavily damaged near Lille, though he managed to crash land and escape the Germans. On 11 September he rejoined his squadron and the following day he replaced Kuhlmann as Squadron Leader. He left the air force soon after the end of the war.

== Decorations ==
- Bronze Cross, Royal Decree Number 3 of 19 August 1940 (Reserve Second Lieutenant in the Artillery)
- Airman's Cross, Royal Decree Number 8 of 6 January 1944 (Reserve First Lieutenant Flyer in the Air Force)
- War Remembrance Cross with bar

== Bibliography ==
- "Biography".
- "Nederlandse Squadrons in het buitenland".
