= Roswell International Air Center =

Airport in New Mexico, United States

Roswell Air Center
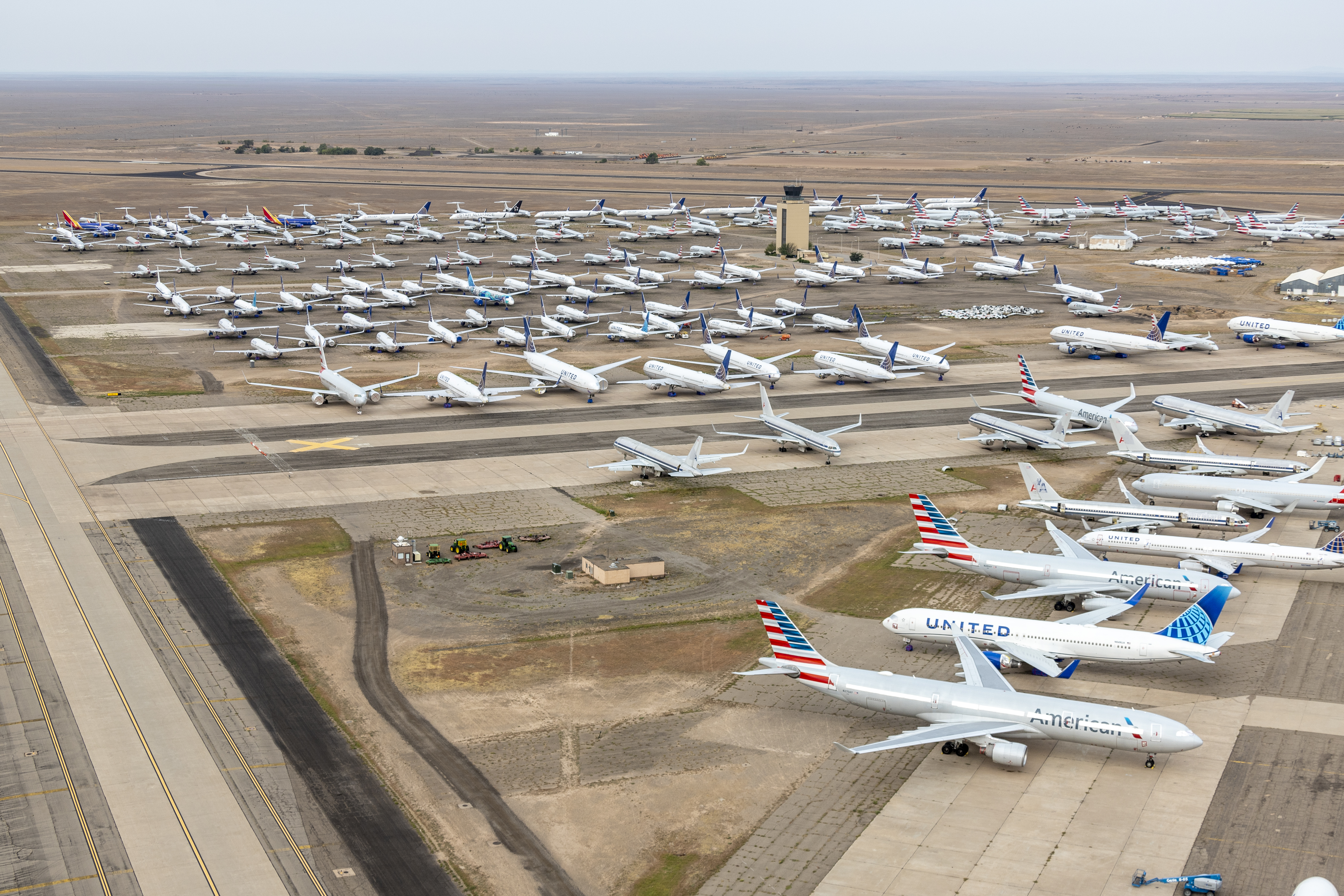
- Commercial aircraft storage in 2020
- IATA: ROW; ICAO: KROW; FAA LID: ROW

Summary
- Airport type: Public company
- Owner: City of Roswell
- Serves: Roswell, New Mexico
- Elevation AMSL: 3,671 ft (1,119 m)
- Coordinates: 33°18′5.6″N 104°31′50″W
- Website: www.flyroswell.com

Map
- Location of airport in New Mexico ROW (the United States)

Runways
Direction	Length		Surface
Direction	ft	m	Surface
03/21	13,000	3,962	Concrete
17/35	10,008	3,048	Asphalt

Statistics (2024)
- Aircraft operations: 26,562
- Based aircraft: 38
- Source: Federal Aviation Administration

Roswell Air Center (IATA: ROW, ICAO: KROW, FAA LID: ROW) (Roswell International Air Center; Roswell Industrial Air Center) is an airport five miles (8.0 km) south of Roswell, in Chaves County, New Mexico, United States.

== History ==
The airport was Roswell Army Airfield during World War II, and Walker Air Force Base during the Cold War. When it closed it was the largest base of the United States Air Force Strategic Air Command. Roswell Industrial Air Center was developed after the closure of Walker Air Force Base on June 30, 1967. Commercial airline flights were moved from the old Municipal airport to the Air Center shortly afterwards and Trans-Texas Airlines upgraded some of its flights serving Roswell to Douglas DC-9 jets.

Walker AFB was named after General Kenneth Newton Walker, a native of Los Cerrillos. He was killed during a bombing mission over Rabaul, New Britain, Papua New Guinea. on January 5, 1943. Though intercepted by enemy fighters, his group scored direct hits on nine Japanese ships. General Walker was last seen leaving the target area with one engine on fire and several fighters on his tail. For his actions, General Walker was awarded the Medal of Honor posthumously by President Franklin D. Roosevelt in 1943.

The base was renamed in his honor on January 13, 1948. Walker Hall, at Maxwell Air Force Base, Alabama, home of the College of Aerospace Doctrine Research and Education, is also named after the general.

In 1966 the Air Force announced that Walker AFB would close. This was during a round of base closings and consolidations as the Defense Department struggled to pay the expenses of the Vietnam War within the budgetary limits set by Congress.

It is also known for the 1947 Roswell UFO incident.

The site was used for several years to launch stratospheric balloons for Air Force projects.

The airfield also serves as a storage facility for a fleet of retired airliners (aircraft) for a number of operators, including a number of Boeing 767 wide body jetliners, MD-80 narrow body jets, formerly operated by American Airlines. A Lockheed JetStar, once owned by Elvis Presley, and sold at auction in May 2017, had spent over 30 years sitting on a tarmac at the airport. The Jetstar was again sold at auction in January 2023 for $286,000.

On April 2, 2011, a new Gulfstream G650 crashed shortly after takeoff from the airport during a test flight that was being conducted by the manufacturer of this large, twin engine business jet, killing all four aboard.

The airport was used by Felix Baumgartner to launch his record-breaking freefall jump from the stratosphere on October 14, 2012. Then again for Alan Eustace's near space skydive in October 2014.

On August 23, 2016, as part of a dramatic fleet renewal plan, American Airlines retired 20 McDonnell Douglas MD-80 aircraft to Roswell, resulting in the most aircraft retired by a commercial airline in a single day.

On September 4, 2019, American Airlines retired its remaining McDonnell Douglas MD-80 aircraft to Roswell.

On May 23, 2024, the Reno Air Racing Association announced starting in 2025, the Roswell International Air Center will host the National Championship Air Races and Air Show starting in 2025, replacing the Reno Stead Airport.

== Facilities ==
The airport covers 5,029 acres (2,035 ha) and has two paved runways:

- 3/21: 13,000 ft × 150 ft (3,962 m × 46 m) asphalt/concrete
- 17/35: 10,008 ft × 100 ft (3,050 m × 30 m) asphalt

In the year ending December 31, 2021 the airport had 27,690 aircraft operations, average 76 per day: 38% general aviation, 46% military, 8% air taxi and 8% airline. 38 aircraft were then based at this airport: 22 single-engine, 9 multi-engine, 5 jet, and 2 helicopters.

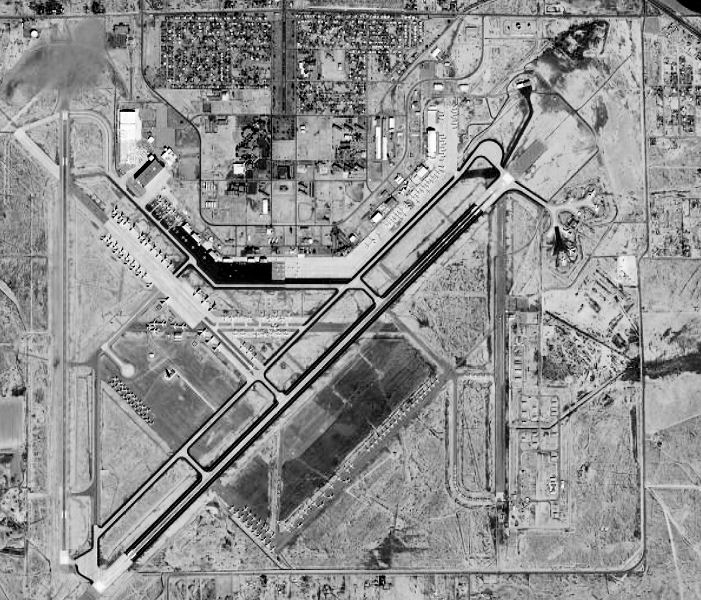
Satellite view of Roswell Air Center in 1997

Below are annual total aircraft operations 2009–2013 from the FAA's Air Traffic Activity System. Average yearly increase was 5.11% over these five years.

Aircraft operations: ROW 2009–2013
Calendar year	Aircraft operations	%
2009	48,726	
2010	51,958	6.63%
2011	35,673	−31.34%
2012	34,671	−2.81%
2013	53,075	53.08%

=== Museum ===
The Walker Aviation Museum is a museum displaying local aviation memorabilia located inside the terminal.

== Airlines and destinations ==
Airlines	Destinations
American Eagle	Dallas/Fort Worth
United Express	Denver

Destinations map
Destinations from Roswell International Air Center
Red = Year-round destination

=== Historical airline service ===
Continental Airlines provided Roswell's first commercial air service beginning on May 14, 1940, flying a route from Denver to El Paso with stops at Colorado Springs, Pueblo, Las Vegas, Santa Fe, Albuquerque, Roswell, Hobbs, and Carlsbad. The aircraft operated was a twin engine Lockheed Model 10 Electra. By 1944, Continental upgraded to Lockheed Model 18 Lodestars followed soon by Douglas DC-3's. The routing of the flights was changed at Hobbs to continue to San Antonio, TX, stopping at Midland/Odessa, Big Spring, and San Angelo.

In 1948, Pioneer Air Lines began service with DC-3s on a route from Amarillo to El Paso stopping at Clovis, Roswell, and Las Cruces. Pioneer's service to Roswell was short lived and ended by 1951. Pioneer had other routes throughout Texas and was merged into Continental in 1955 which allowed Continental to begin direct flights from Roswell to Dallas via several stops, still using DC-3s.

By late 1963, Continental had grown into a major airline and transferred all Roswell service to Trans-Texas Airways (TTa). TTa soon upgraded its DC-3 flights with 40-seat Convair 240 aircraft and later to Convair 600 turboprops. All commercial service had been flown from Roswell's Municipal Airport on the northwest corner of the city until 1968 when all service was moved to the current airport, the former Walker AFB, with much longer runways. By April 28, 1968, TTa introduced 75-seat Douglas DC-9-10 jets on a Santa Fe - Albuquerque - Roswell - Abilene - Dallas - Houston route which was Roswell's first jet service. In early 1970, the DC-9 flight routing was changed to Los Angeles (LAX) - Albuquerque - Roswell - Midland/Odessa - Dallas - Houston providing Roswell with one-stop jet service to both Dallas and Los Angeles. TTa was renamed Texas International Airlines (TI) in 1969 and continued to serve Roswell with DC-9s and Convair 600s, the latter providing service to Amarillo, Lubbock, and El Paso. Passenger traffic at Roswell had increased dramatically with the DC-9 jets and a new and much larger terminal building opened in 1975. In the late 1970s, TI began retiring the Convair 600 turboprops, and by spring 1979, the carrier had only one flight from Roswell to Albuquerque continuing to Dallas/Ft. Worth and Houston on a 100-seat McDonnell Douglas DC-9-30.

On October 1, 1979, Texas International ceased serving the airport. All service had now been transferred to commuter airlines which operated much smaller aircraft and only provided service as far as Albuquerque, El Paso, Amarillo, Lubbock, and Midland/Odessa requiring passengers to change planes onto another airline to travel to any larger hub city. During the 1960s and 1970s, Roswell also saw supplemental regional service by a few other commuters; Bison Airlines (1963/1964), Trans Central Airlines (1970), and home-based Roswell Airlines (1975–1978).

The commuter airlines that operated service since 1979 are as follows:

Air Midwest was designated as the primary replacement for TI in all of southeastern New Mexico. Service to Roswell began on March 1, 1979, with 17-seat Fairchild Swearingen Metroliners to Albuquerque, Lubbock, and later to Midland/Odessa with passengers now having to change planes and airlines to travel to hub cities such as Dallas/Ft. Worth (DFW). At first Air Midwest competed with Zia Airlines operating Handley Page Jetstreams and Crown Airlines flying Piper Navajos to Albuquerque, now the primary route from Roswell, offering up to thirteen roundtrip flights per day but both of these carriers shut down in 1980. There was also a fourth carrier, Permian Airways, flying Piper Navajos to Amarillo and El Paso, but it too ended service in 1980. Air Midwest had then become the only airline at Roswell and passenger traffic was declining. Another small commuter, Airways of New Mexico, briefly provided service to El Paso in 1983 and 1984.

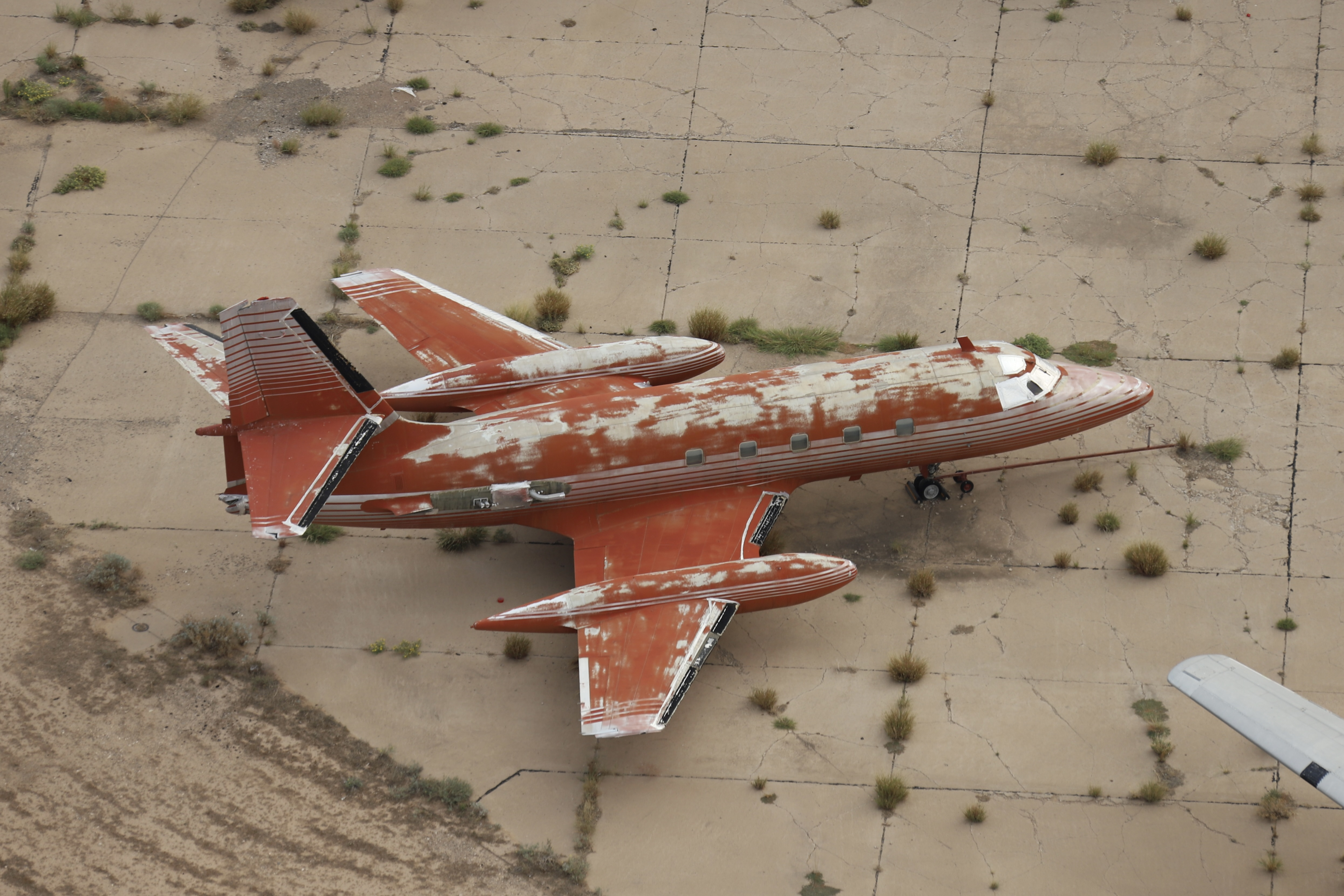
A 1962 Lockheed Jetstar previously owned by Elvis Presley sat parked in Roswell for decades

In early 1984, Mesa Airlines began serving Roswell from Albuquerque and Lubbock operating 14-seat Beechcraft 99s in competition with Air Midwest and passenger traffic nearly doubled that year. By 1985, the two carriers were operating a combined total of up to eleven roundtrip nonstop flights a day to Albuquerque. Mesa's eastbound flights to Lubbock were later switched to Midland/Odessa and ended soon after.

Air Midwest ended their Roswell service in early 1986, and Trans-Colorado Airlines immediately began flights to Albuquerque on Swearingen Metros. In April 1987, Trans-Colorado became a Continental Express feeder carrier for Continental Airlines. Flights were then added to El Paso via Carlsbad. At this time, Mesa added more flights to Albuquerque giving the route 20 daily departures each way. Trans-Colorado ended all service at the end of July 1987 leaving Mesa as the only carrier serving Roswell. In the fall of 1987, Mesa added two daily nonstop flights to DFW operated with 13-seat Beechcraft 1300s and later upgrading to 19-seat Beechcraft 1900Ds. All flights to Albuquerque were soon upgraded with Beech 1900Ds as well.

In 1995, Mesa dropped their DFW flights and later that year Lone Star Airlines came to Roswell with two flights to DFW on Swearingen Metros. At one point in November 1995, Lone Star operated a 32-seat Dornier 328 propjet. Mesa returned to the Roswell - DFW market in 1997 and, between Mesa and Lone Star, a total of six daily nonstop flights were operated to DFW. Lone Star later changed their name to Aspen Mountain Air but ended their Roswell service in 1998.

Big Sky Airlines briefly came to Roswell in 2000/2001 operating one daily roundtrip on a DFW - Hobbs - Carlsbad - Roswell - Denver route giving Roswell its first nonstop service to Denver. This carrier also used Swearingen Metros.

After the events of 9/11/2001, Mesa again dropped their DFW flights and reduced flights to Albuquerque over the next few years as passenger traffic declined severely. The city began aggressively pursuing service with major airlines to provide nonstop regional jet flights to a major hub which had become common for many cities the size of Roswell across the country.

American Eagle, the feeder carrier for American Airlines responded and began service on September 5, 2007, with two daily nonstop flights to Dallas/Ft. Worth on 50-seat Embraer 145s. The service did so well that a third flight was added only a few months later. Mesa Airlines, which was down to only two flights per day to Albuquerque, then ended all of their Roswell service on the last day of 2007. At the request of Roswell city officials, American Eagle began a westbound flight nonstop to Los Angeles in August 2009, but this flight did not become profitable and ended after one year. The carrier began another westbound flight to Phoenix in March 2016 after American Airlines completed its merger with US Airways and gained the latter carriers' hub operation at Phoenix. The service is subsidized by a two-year revenue guarantee with grants from the federal Small Community Air Service Development Program, the cities of Roswell, Phoenix, Artesia, Carlsbad, and Ruidoso, and Chaves and Eddy Counties. All flights to DFW and Phoenix were upgraded with 65-seat Canadair CRJ-700s in 2017. During the latter half of 2017, the DFW flights were upgraded again with 76-seat Embraer 175 and Canadair CRJ-900 regional jets but were reverted to CRJ-700's by early 2018. With the COVID-19 pandemic beginning in March 2020, the Phoenix flight was discontinued and service to DFW was reduced to one flight per day, however all service was restored by April 2021. During the month of February, 2023, one flight to DFW was again upgraded to a CRJ-900 aircraft. The Phoenix flights were later discontinued again in May 2023.

United Express operated by SkyWest Airlines on behalf of United Airlines began service on February 17, 2026, with two daily flights to Denver using Bombardier CRJ-200 regional jets.

== Other uses ==
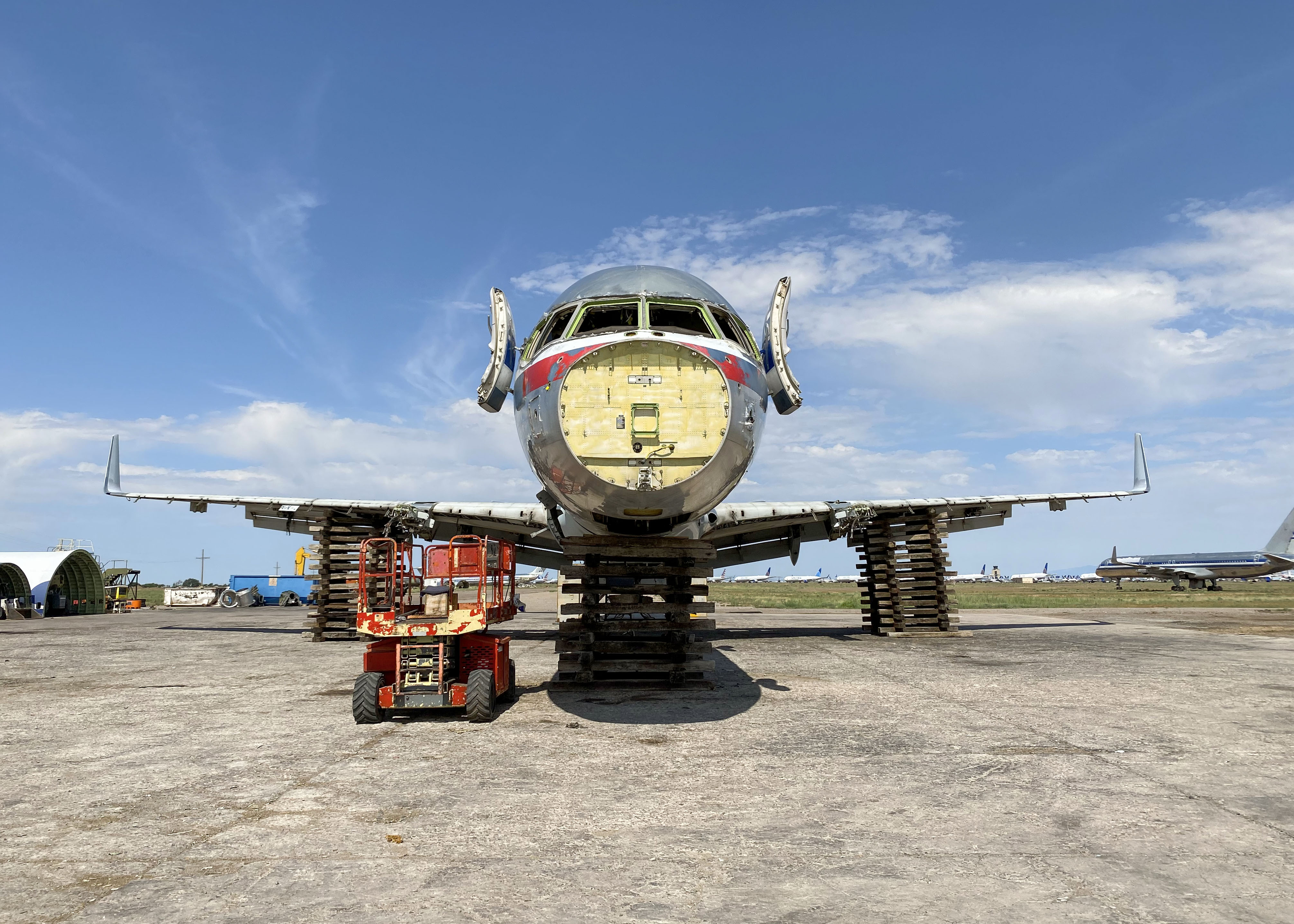
An ex-American Airlines Boeing 757-200 being scrapped at the airport

In addition to the airport, RIAC is home to Millennium Transit Services, New Mexico Rehabilitation Center, a plastics manufacturer, and a candy manufacturer. Eastern New Mexico University has a campus there, and aircraft repair and refurbishing companies including AerSale have airliners stored onsite.

In 2002 a series of charter flights operated by Trans World Airlines (TWA) with Boeing 767-300 aircraft were flown into Roswell in order to transport trainees for the Federal Air Marshal service. This training was conducted at the Federal Law Enforcement Training Center in nearby Artesia.

The Boeing Company uses the airfield for braking performance testing of its aircraft, most recently the testing of BF Goodrich carbon brakes on the Boeing 737-900ER model. Brake testing has also been performed on the Boeing 787 Dreamliner in 2014 and the Boeing 777X at the airport in April 2021.

A New Mexico National Guard unit uses several buildings on the airport grounds.

The airport also serves as a bustling aircraft boneyard, with such airlines as Air Canada, Copa Airlines, Kenya Airways and Scoot storing their used aircraft at the location. During the COVID-19 pandemic in 2020, more than 300 aircraft were ferried to ROW for storage, mostly by American Airlines and United Airlines. Elvis Presley's private jet was parked here for 40 years before being sold in 2023.

== Accidents ==
- On April 2, 2011, a Gulfstream G650 crashed during takeoff, killing the four Gulfstream employees on board. During the test flight, the right engines's thrust was reduced to idle, causing the aircraft to be airborne at a high angle of attack before the right wing tip hit the runway, slid on the ground, struck a concrete structure and caught fire.
