= Delta Airbase =

Delta Air Base
- IATA: none; ICAO: none; FAA LID: NC24

Summary
- Airport type: Private
- Owner: Charlotte Aircraft Corporation
- Operator: Charlotte, North Carolina
- Serves: Charlotte metropolitan area
- Location: Charlotte, North Carolina, USA
- Elevation AMSL: 778 ft / 237 m
- Coordinates: 35°12′48″N 080°43′23.53″W
- Website: http://www.charlotteaircraft.com/

Map

Runways
Direction	Length		Surface
Direction	ft	m	Surface
18/36	1,000	305	Grass

Delta Airbase was a private airstrip located at the intersection of East Harris Boulevard & Albemarle Road in Charlotte, NC.

== History ==
The airport, initially called "Grove Airport," was built sometime between late 1941 to mid-1942 (it was not yet depicted on the May 1941 14M Regional Aeronautical Chart).

The earliest depiction of an airfield at the site was on the August 1942 14M Regional Aeronautical Chart, depicting "Grove" as a commercial or municipal airport. The airport was still depicted as “Grove” on the 1943 Regional Aeronautical Chart.

At some point during 1943-44 the field was renamed "Delta" on the 1944 Regional Aeronautical Chart, and remained “Delta” on the October 1948 Charlotte Sectional Chart. According to Mr. Jenks Caldwell, Jr., the current owner of Delta Airbase, the airfield was named "Delta" after people coming from the Mississippi Delta area during World War II had established the airfield to train pilots for the war effort.

Delta Air Base was listed as a private airfield in the 1962 AOPA Airport Directory, with a single 3,100' turf Runway 18/36.

An aerial photo looking northeast at Delta Air Base from the 1963 NC Airport Directory, which depicted at least 22 large piston-engine airliners (DC-3s & DC-4s) parked tightly together in a separate clearing adjacent to the south side of the field. In the 1960s, Delta Air Base was the home of a bustling aircraft salvage operation.

By the time of the August 1972 Charlotte Sectional Chart, Delta's runway had been lengthened to 4,200'.

The 1982 AOPA Airport Directory described Delta as having a single 4,200' Runway 18/36.

Sometime before 1996 the runway was shortened and some of the land was used to develop an apartment complex. This is evidenced by the fact that 1996 USGS topo map, the runway's length has shrunk back to 3,000'. In the 2002 USGS aerial photo of Delta air Base, a shortened portion of the grass runway remained clear, and a large number of hangars still remained standing along the west side of the runway.

As of mid 2021, all of the buildings have been demolished and the property has been developed into apartments.

As of early 2025, the FAA still lists Delta as an active private heliport (designation NC24) though no aircraft operations are possible.
