= Châteauroux-Centre "Marcel Dassault" Airport =

Châteauroux-Centre "Marcel Dassault" Airport Aéroport de Châteauroux-Centre "Marcel Dassault"
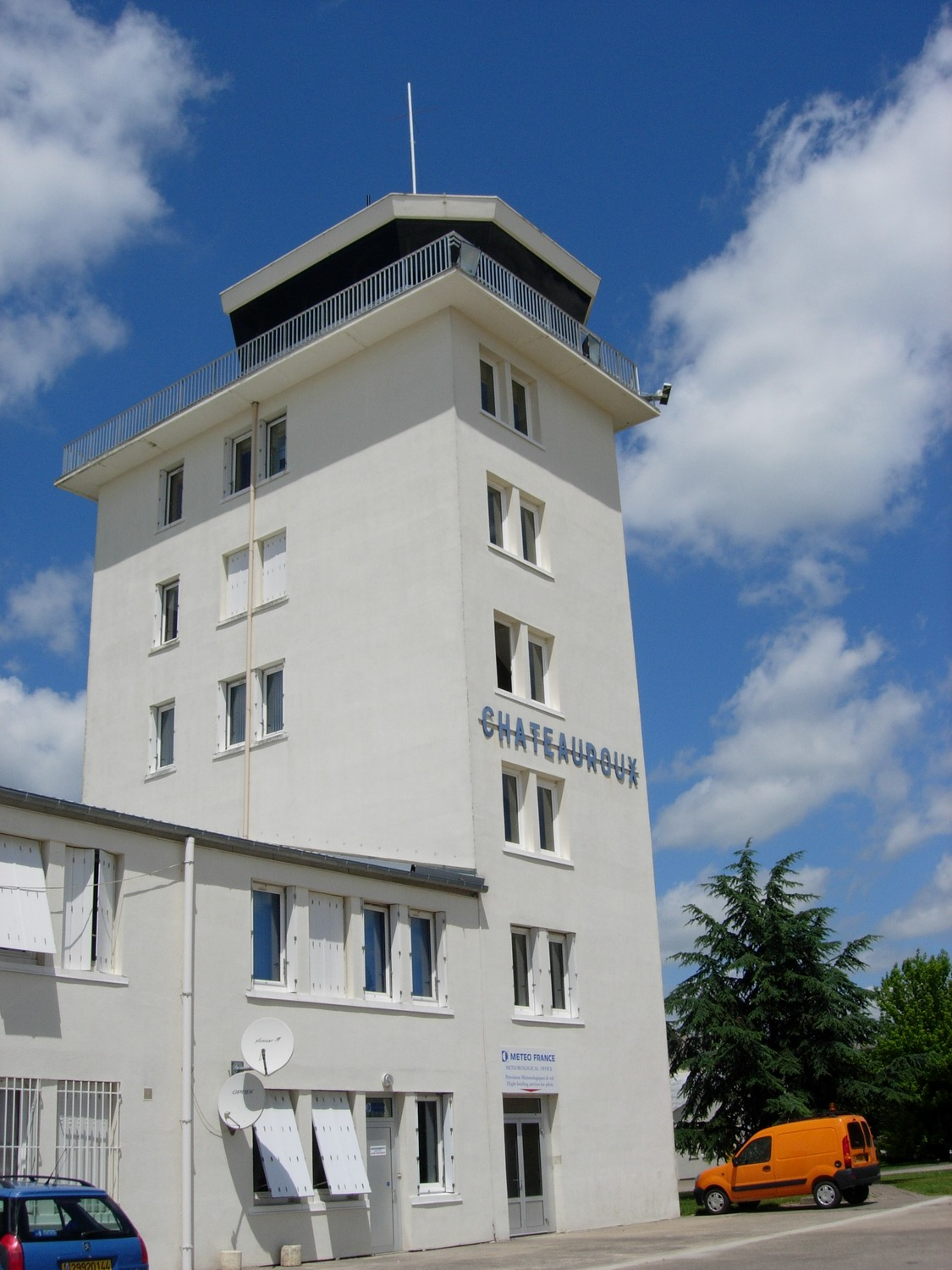
- IATA: CHR; ICAO: LFLX

Summary
- Airport type: Public, cargo and industrial
- Operator: Aéroport Châteauroux-Centre
- Serves: Châteauroux
- Location: Déols, Indre, France
- Elevation AMSL: 529 ft (161 m)
- Coordinates: 46°51′37″N 001°43′16″E
- Website: chateauroux.aeroport.fr

Maps
- Location of Centre region in France

- Location in Centre-Val de Loire region

Runways
| Direction | Length | | Surface |
| Direction | m | ft | Surface |
|---|---|---|---|
| 03/21 | 3,500 | 11,483 | Concrete |
- Source: French AIP, UAF, Airport

Châteauroux-Centre "Marcel Dassault" Airport (French: Aéroport de Châteauroux-Centre "Marcel Dassault", IATA: CHR, ICAO: LFLX), formerly known as Châteauroux-Déols "Marcel Dassault" Airport, is an airport serving the French city of Châteauroux. The airport is located 5.5 km (3.0 NM) north-northeast of Châteauroux in Déols, a commune of the Indre department in the Centre-Val de Loire region in France. The airport is named after Marcel Dassault and is located on the site of the former Châteauroux-Déols Air Base. It is dedicated to air freight, aeronautical maintenance, pilot training and training of airport firefighters.

== Facilities ==
Châteauroux-Centre Airport is at an elevation of 529 feet (161 m) above mean sea level. It has one paved runway designated 03/21 which measures 3,500 by 45 metres (11,483 ft × 148 ft). The airport is used by both passenger and cargo planes.

Châteauroux-Centre Airport serves as a pilot training site for both commercial and military planes. Users of the facility include: Airbus, Air Caraïbes, Air France, ATR, the Belgian Air Force, British Airways, EasyJet, KLM, the French Air and Space Force, French Bee, Hi Fly, Lufthansa, Swiss International Air Lines and Transavia France with all types of aircraft up to the Airbus A380 and Boeing 747.

In the years 1990 to 2000, the airport was used regularly by Air France and British Airways to train future pilots and flight crews for Concorde.

The Châteauroux airport has also devoted part of its activity to air freight. Its predominantly industrial vocation allows it to handle all types of aircraft (such as the An-225) and cargo 24 hours a day, 7 days a week. This is a transit airport that does not no "slot" and relies on road transport.

Since August 2020, Châteauroux-Centre airport has been one of 23 pelicandromes for the supply of sécurité civile Bombardier Q400MR in case of need.

Since 1 January 2000, the Châteauroux-Centre airport has been an 'authorized cargo security agent'. It is one of the few French airports that made this approach and obtained the approval of the French Civil Aviation Authority. (DGAC) This allows it to offer shippers, carriers and freight forwarders a "cargo security" service controlled by the airport security supervisor.

The airport has a large aeronautical maintenance area called " Chateauroux Air Center " on which the following companies are installed in 2026:

- Daher: on the Châteauroux airport, this company is in charge of providing maintenance and assistance services to Airbus aircraft awaiting delivery such as Airbus A320neo, Airbus A330neo and Airbus A350 XWB.
- Dale Aviation: specialized in the transition and maintenance of commercial aircraft Airbus A320 family, Airbus A330 and Airbus A340 as well as Boeing 737, Boeing 757, and Boeing 777. Dale Aviation also stores aircraft with operational support.
- Paprec: has an aircraft dismantling and recycling platform of 10,000 m^{2} (110,000 sq ft).
- Satys: specialized in surface finishing and aeronautical painting with four aircraft paint shops. These comprise 1 bay for regional aircraft up to ATR 72 or Embraer ERJ 145, 1 bay for narrow body aircraft up to Airbus A321 or Boeing 757, two bays for wide bodies aircraft : one up to Airbus A330 / Airbus A330neo, Airbus A340-300, Boeing 777-200ER and one up to Airbus A350-1000, Boeing 777-300ER.
- Vallair: on site of Chateauroux, the company is specialized in the storage, transition and maintenance of Airbus A320 family, Airbus A330 / Airbus A330neo, Airbus A340, ATR 42 / ATR 72 and Boeing 737, dismantling of end-of-life aircraft and engines with recovery and repair of elements for the maintenance market as well as the conversion of Airbus A321 and Airbus A330 into a freighter plane.

Thus, the airport is a "one stop shop"; that is to say that a commercial aircraft owner (airline, lessor) finds all the activities (storage, maintenance, painting, cargo conversion, dismantling and recycling) on one and the same site.

C2FPA, an airport fire fighter training center, is based at Châteauroux-Centre Airport. The center offers certification specializing in areas like aviation fire protection and wildlife hazard control.

The business cluster Aérocentre is located on the airport.

== Airlines and destinations ==
=== Passenger ===
The airport offers for 2025 around twenty "charter" flights during the spring-summer season, such as Portugal, Canary Islands, Croatia and Montenegro, Malta, Jordan or Greece.

=== Cargo ===
There are no regular cargo flights at Chateauroux airport. Currently, only cargo charter flights are operated.

== Access ==
The A20 passes close to the airport.

The airport is served by bus number 6 from the centre of Chateauroux.
