= Gulfstream Aerospace Flight 153 =

2011 fatal air crash in the United States

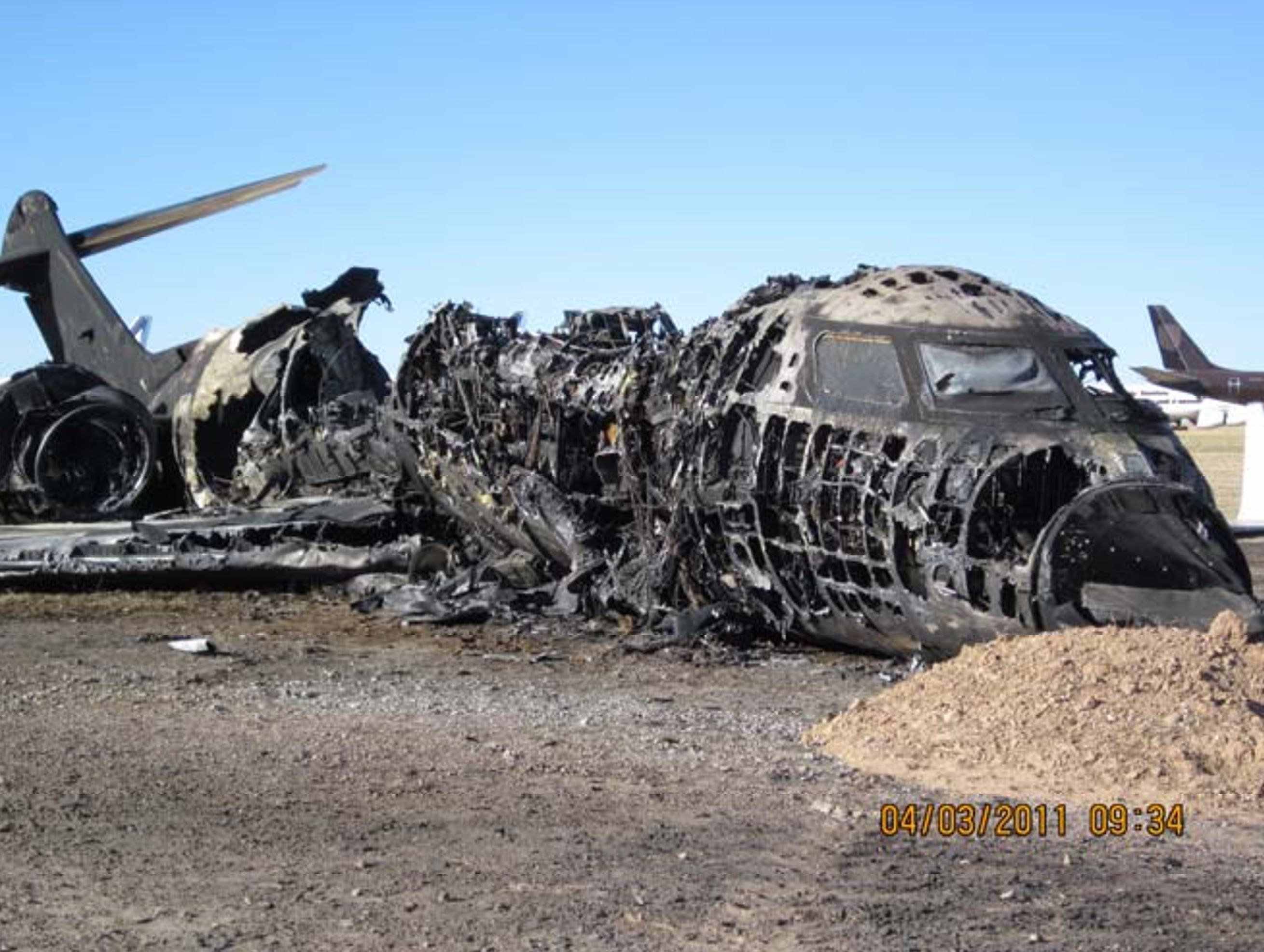
- The burnt-out wreckage of the aircraft

Accident
- Date: April 2, 2011
- Summary: Stall and loss of control during single-engine takeoff
- Site: Roswell International Air Center, Roswell, New Mexico, United States

Aircraft
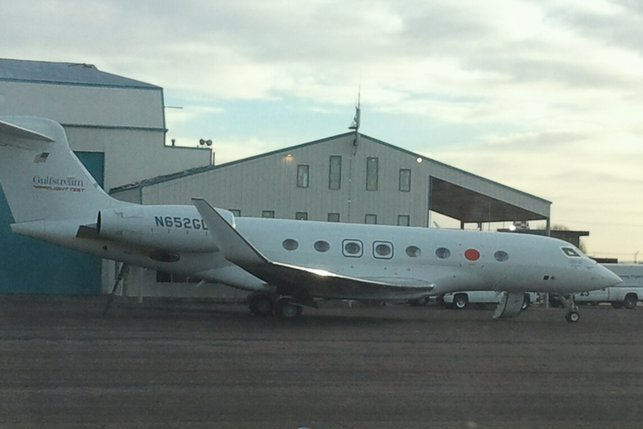
- N652GD, the aircraft involved, photographed in March 2011
- Aircraft type: Gulfstream G650
- Operator: Gulfstream Aerospace
- Registration: N652GD
- Flight origin: Roswell International Air Center, Roswell, New Mexico, United States
- Destination: Roswell International Air Center, Roswell, New Mexico, United States
- Occupants: 4
- Passengers: 0
- Crew: 4
- Fatalities: 4
- Survivors: 0

Gulfstream Aerospace Flight 153 was a test flight with a Gulfstream G650 on the April 2, 2011. The second G650 test aircraft crashed during takeoff from the Roswell International Air Center, New Mexico, killing the four crew members on board.

The aircraft was conducting a test involving a single-engine start to simulate an engine failure. The G650 became airborne briefly at a high angle of attack before its right wingtip hit the runway; then it slid on the ground, struck a concrete berm, and caught fire.

== Background ==
For the certification of the Gulfstream G650, Gulfstream Aerospace maintained an ambitious flight test program. The manufacturer expected a certification of the aircraft type in the 3rd quarter 2011.

=== Aircraft ===
The aircraft involved, which took its first flight on February 25, 2010, was the second prototype of the newly developed Gulfstream G650 business aircraft with movement number 6002 (registered N652GD), owned by its manufacturer Gulfstream Aerospace. The aircraft was equipped with two Rolls-Royce BR700-725A1-12 engines. The aircraft had completed a total operating capacity of 434 operating hours up to the accident.

=== Occupants ===
There was a crew of four on board the aircraft, consisting of two flight crew in the roles of Captain and First Officer, as well as two flight test engineers:

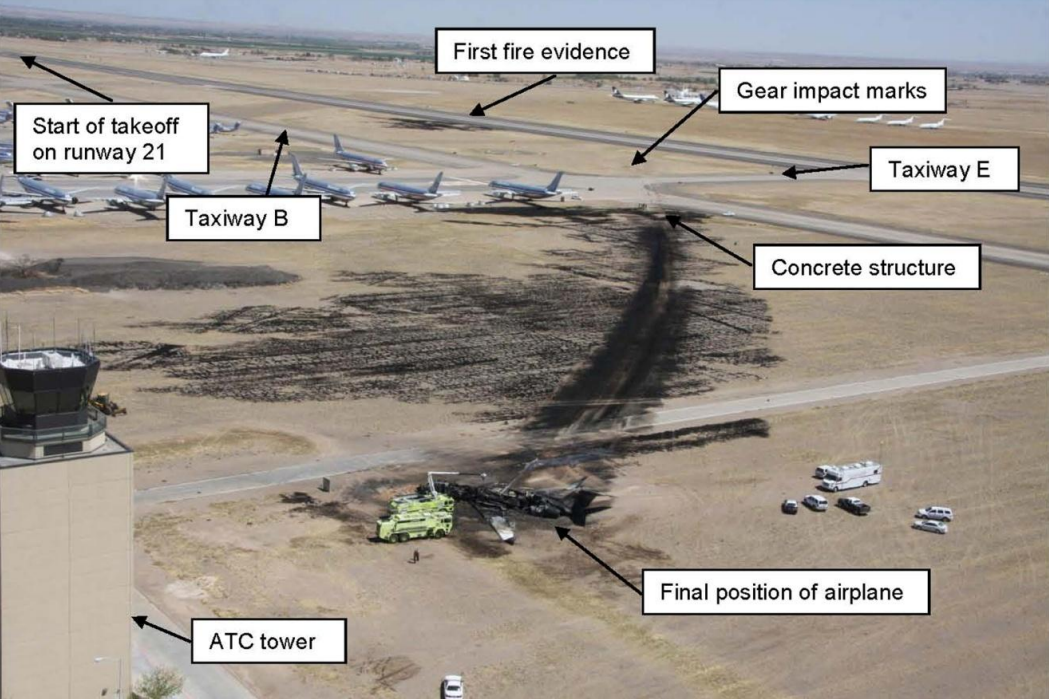
- The aftermath of Flight 153
  The 64-year-old Captain Kent Crenshaw had acquired a commercial pilot license after a career as a military pilot in April 1981 and was initially responsible for the Boeing 707 licensed. In January 1991, he was approved for Learjet. Between October 1997 and October 1998, he expanded his portfolio to training around the aircraft types Gulfstream V, Boeing 707 and 720, Grumman Gulfstream II, and he had been working as a test pilot for Gulfstream Aerospace since August 1997. He had 11,237 hours of flight experience, of which he had completed 237 hours in the cockpit of the Gulfstream G650. In the role of pilot in command, he had completed 160 flight hours with aircraft of this type.
- The 51-year-old First Officer Vivan Ragusa II had received a commercial pilot license in July 1990 based on his flight experience as a military pilot. In November 2006, he received a model authorization for the Boeing 737. Between August 2007 and December 2009, he acquired further model authorizations for the aircraft types IAI 1125 and Gulfstream V. He had 3,940 hours of flight experience, of which 140 hours were on the Gulfstream G650.

== Accident ==
The aircraft was conducting test flight, with a takeoff-performance test during which an engine failure was simulated by reducing the right engine's thrust to idle. The objective of this maneuver was to assess the takeoff distance at minimal flap position during an engine failure scenario. The takeoff occurred at 9:34 a.m. Shortly after takeoff at a high angle of attack, the aircraft began to roll uncontrollably to the right. The Gulfstream made contact with the ground on its right wingtip and subsequently veered off the runway. The landing gear was sheared off, and the aircraft collided with a concrete structure and a weather station. It continued to slide along the ground and caught fire. Tragically, all four occupants lost their lives, and the aircraft was nearly completely consumed by the fire.

All four crew members initially survived the crash and impact. The leg of Captain Crenshaw was pinned in the wreckage. The other three crew members were able to get out their chairs and reached the main cabin door. However, they were not able to open it due to the flames and smoke by which they died. The team members on the ground went to the aircraft from the telemetry trailer, but were not able to reach it closely due to the heat. Four minutes after impact, the fire trucks arrived on the scene.

== Investigation ==
The National Transportation Safety Board took over the investigation into the cause of the accident. Before the official report the Board released a list of 19 findings, a statement of probable cause and ten recommendations.

The accident happened because the right wing stalled shortly after lift-off, rolling the aircraft. The right wing stalled due to the presence of a crosswind from the left side and a sideslip caused by having the right engine at idle. The stall was caused due to the exceeding of the incorrectly calculated critical angle of attack. There were two earlier wing drop-off events of a Aircraft 6002: Flight 88 in November 2010 (with the same pilot-in-command on board) and Flight 132 in March 2011 (Flight 132). These two wing-drop incidents had not been sufficiently investigated by Gulfstream, so that the final cause could only be determined after the crash.

Three main causes were identified during the investigation:

- Gulfstream's failure to properly calculate and validate the take-off speeds for the flight tests and to detect and correct the V2 error during previous G650 flight tests.
- Increasingly aggressive attempts by the flight test team to reach V2 speeds that were set too low.
- Gulfstream's insufficient investigation of previous incidents during the test campaign (Flight 88 on 16 November 2010 and flight 132 on 14 March 2011), which indicated that the maximum angle of attack of the aircraft estimated by the company was too high in the ground effect.

The tight test program specified by the company had also contributed to the accident on two of the three points: The test pilots tried to achieve the lowest possible V2 in order to achieve the take-off and landing distances already promised in advance and there was no time to get to the bottom of major errors.

== Follow-up ==
The NTSB accused Gulfstream of withholding information, which the company denied. The NTSB also objected to Gulfstream's use of legal counsel during the investigation.

Gulfstream Aerospace changed its flight test program procedures according to the recommendations from the investigation. Gulfstream raised the V2 speed of the G650 from 135 knots (250 km/h) to 150 knots (280 km/h). There were no later incidents in the G650 test program. Bizjet received its certification in September.
