= Aircraft Fleet Recycling Association =

International non-profit association

The Aircraft Fleet Recycling Association (AFRA) is an international non-profit association that brings together manufacturers, recycling companies and aviation tech companies across the aircraft industry. It aims to promote environmental best practices, regulatory excellence and sustainable development in aircraft disassembly and in the salvaging and recycling of aircraft parts and materials.

Aircraft recycling is being addressed by multiple companies through individual environmental programmes. AFRA aims to provide an international perspective, advising aviation industry stakeholders on the legal, regulatory and technical issues of aircraft recycling and promoting greater cooperation among governments and industries.

== Market ==
Of the 400 to 450 aircraft scrapped and disassembled globally each year, around one third are parted out and disassembled by AFRA members, producing each year more than 30,000 tons of aluminium and 1,800 tons of other specialty alloy metals (including titanium, nickel, magnesium, and more) for recycling. In 2009, AFRA members dismantled more than 9,000 aircraft, including 7,000 commercial and 2,000 military. AFRA believe more value can be extracted from end-of-life activity.

== History ==
AFRA was founded in 2005, when 11 companies from Africa, Europe and North America agreed to develop an industry code of conduct and best practices in the areas of aircraft dismantling and material recycling. The group's aim was to motivate industry around the safe and environmentally responsible way of managing end-of-life aircraft.

The original 11 members were Air Salvage International, Adherent Technologies, Bartin Group, The Boeing Company, Chateauroux Air Centre, Europe Aviation, Huron Valley Fritz, Milled Carbon, Rolls-Royce, and WINGNet.

== Membership ==
AFRA members include original equipment manufacturers, aircraft disassemblers, parts distributors, aircraft insurers and appraisers, materials recyclers, and technology developers. AFRA is also associated with technological companies and the academic community regarding research and development of recycling technologies. AFRA has grown from its founding 11 members to now encompass 40 members from 10 countries.

== Mission ==
The organization's mission is the sustainable management of end-of-life airframes and engines. AFRA promotes and publishes the collective experience of its members to improve best practice in the management of end-of-life aircraft. AFRA also encourages greater collaboration between organizations and companies that have a track record in the environmentally responsible management of end-of-life aircraft.

AFRA develops partnerships and industry collaborations to create and enhance innovative technologies meant to improve environmentally sustainable practices in managing end-of-life aircraft. The organization is also developing technology that they believe can increase the economic value of aircraft assets. The safe handling and disposal of materials that cannot be recycled is a key priority of AFRA, as is returning reclaimed metals and composite materials back into commercial and aircraft manufacturing. AFRA members ultimately target a 95% recyclability rate.

== Accreditation ==
AFRA accreditation is meant to inform the aviation industry, customers and potential customers that best management practice and environmental responsibility is at the heart of a company’s processes and practices.

Since its foundation, 12 AFRA members have achieved AFRA accreditation: Aircraft End-of-Life Solutions (AELS), Air Salvage International, Bonus Tech, Europe Aviation, Evergreen Trade, Orange Aero, P3 Aviation, Southern California Aviation and Volvo Aero Services. A number of other organizations are currently in the process of being accredited. AFRA members increasingly report on the economic added value of AFRA accreditation, with asset owners actively seeking out AFRA accredited members for contracts.

== Best Management Practice ==
The AFRA Best Management Practice (BMP) Guides offer detailed direction on best environmental practices and technological solutions for the disassembling of aircraft airframes and engines.

The AFRA BMP guide is an up-to-date collection of recommendations concerning best practices for the management of parts removed from aircraft during disassembly. The BMP Guide, now in its version 2.0, enhances safety developments throughout the supply chain by encouraging aircraft disassemblers or asset owners to proactively discover whether an aircraft or aircraft part has been involved in an airworthiness event involving unusual heat, stress or abnormal environmental conditions.

Version 1.0 of the BMP Guide was published in 2008 and has become a reference document for those involved in airframe dismantling and recycling. Version 2.0 of the BMP Guide, published in 2009, has an additional focus on engine dismantling. It offers up-to-date recommendations on best practices for the management of engine parts removed from aircraft during disassembly.

AFRA’s Best Management Practice Guide Version 2.0 also gives a new and clearer definition of an ‘airworthiness event’, setting out the circumstances under which the industry feels it is appropriate to convey information about the history of parts.
