= Enschede Airport Twente =

Enschede Twente Airport Advanced Landing Ground B-106
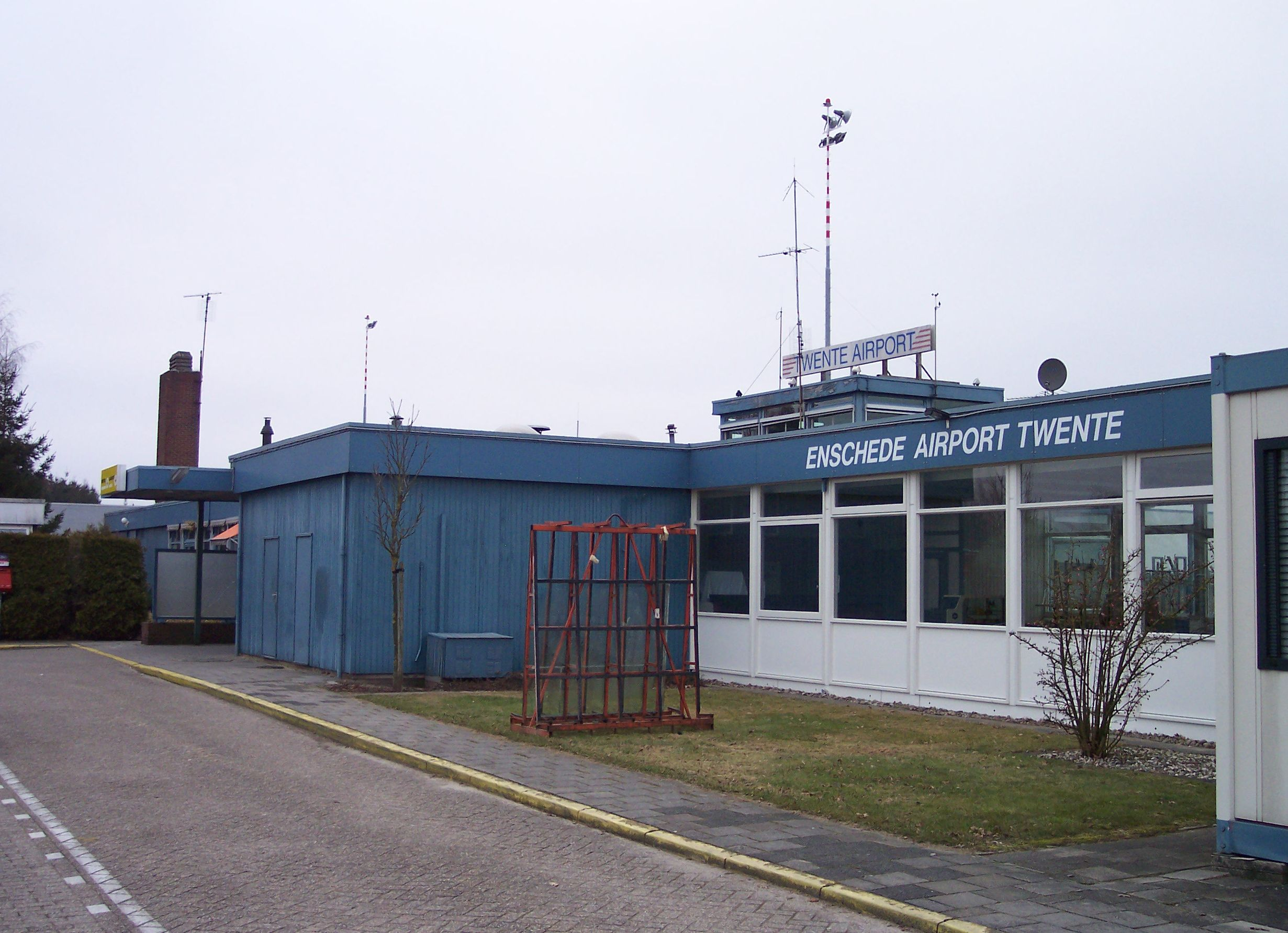
- IATA: ENS; ICAO: EHTW

Summary
- Airport type: Restricted use
- Operator: Twente Airport
- Serves: Enschede, Netherlands
- Location: Enschede, Overijssel
- Built: 1931
- Elevation AMSL: 115 ft (35 m)
- Coordinates: 52°16′33″N 006°53′21″E
- Website: twente-airport.nl

Map
- Location of Twente Airport

Runways
Direction	Length		Surface
Direction	m	ft	Surface
05/23	2,406	7,894	Asphalt
- Source: AIP from AIS the Netherlands

Twente Airport (IATA: ENS, ICAO: EHTW) is located 2 NM (3.7 km; 2.3 mi) outside of Enschede in Overijssel, Netherlands. It has one runway (05/23), though two of the current taxiways and platforms have been used as runways (Platform A, former runway 11/29 and Platform C, former runway 16/34). The airport is currently uncontrolled and closed for scheduled passenger flights and military operations. A local flying club uses the airport for their activities. The airfield has also been approved for limited use by business charter operators and aircraft scrapping, storage and maintenance.

== History ==
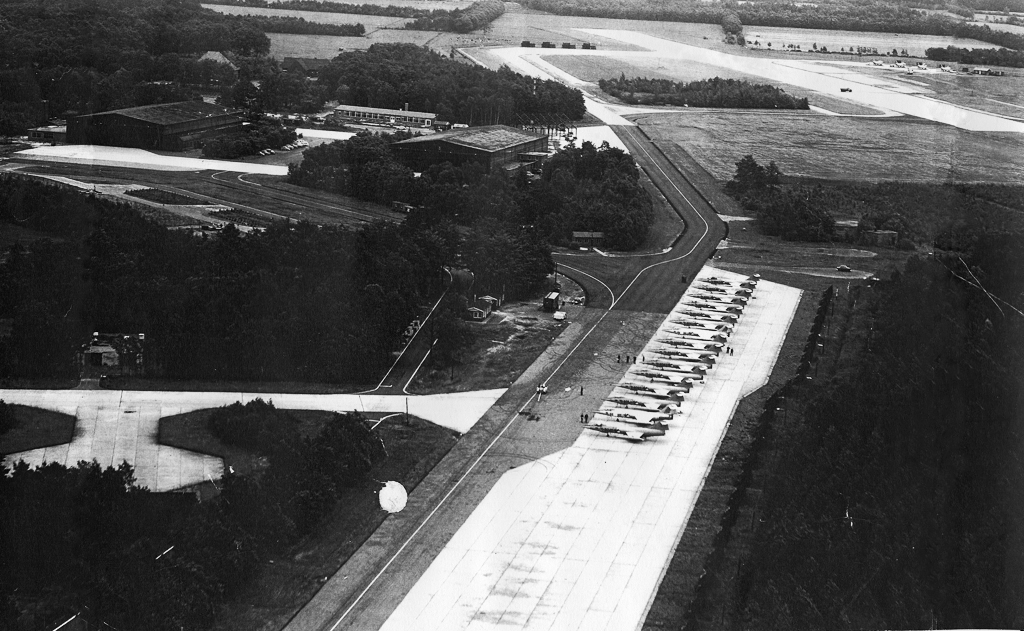
Lockheed F-104 Starfighters on the ramp at Twente in the early 1960s

Twente Airport was opened July 1931 by the mayor of Enschede, Edo Bergsma. KLM started a scheduled flight to Amsterdam in 1932, which was suspended in 1939. During World War II the German Luftwaffe took over the airport and made it a military airbase, renaming it Fliegerhorst Twente. In April 1945 Allied troops reoccupied the airport renaming it to B 106/Twente and transferred ownership to the Dutch armed forces. A minor typo in the deed misspelled the airport name as Airbase Twenthe, with an added 'h'.

Royal Air Force units included: 2 Squadron between 18 April and 30 May 1945, 3 Squadron between 14 and 16 September 1945, 4 Squadron between 17 April and 30 May 1945, 33 Squadron between 14 and 16 September 1945, 41 Squadron between 8 and 16 April 1945, 56 Squadron between 14 and 16 September 1945, 66 Squadron between 18 and 30 April 1945, 127 Squadron between 18 and 30 April 1945, 130 Squadron between 7 and 17 April 1945, 137 Squadron between 11 and 14 April 1945, 181 Squadron between 11 and 13 April 1945, 182 Squadron between 11 and 13 April 1945, 219 Squadron between 8 June and 14 August 1945, 247 Squadron between 12 and 13 April 1945, 264 Squadron between 6 June and 25 August 1945, 268 Squadron between 18 April and 30 May 1945, 322 Squadron between 18 and 30 April 1945, 331 Squadron between 18 and 22 April 1945, 332 Squadron between 18 and 22 April 1945, 349 Squadron between 19 and 30 April 1945, 350 Squadron between 7 and 16 April 1945, 409 Squadron between 11 June and 1 July 1945 & 485 Squadron between 19 and 29 April 1945

After World War II the airport became a "joint use airport", with both civil and military use. The military stationed both fighter and trainer aircraft at the base. Aircraft based at Twente since the Second World War include the Gloster Meteor, Lockheed T-33, Fokker S.14 Machtrainer, Hawker Hunter, North American F-86K Sabre, Lockheed F-104 Starfighter, Northrop NF-5 and General Dynamics F-16 Fighting Falcon.

For civil operations the airport was renamed to Enschede Airport Twente and run by the privately held company Enschede Airport Twente BV.

On 7 December 2007 military use of the airport ceased. As of 1 January 2008 the airport has been closed for civil aviation as well, pending governmental agreement on the future of the airport. On 16 June 2010 the province of Overijssel agreed on a spatial plan including an airport.

On 1 December 2010 the ownership of the airport grounds was transferred to the Twente region and the city of Enschede. Though it was attempted to find a party interested in operating the airport commercially, it was announced on 4 December 2012 that despite three parties showing interest in this proposal, none of them made a bid to operate it. In March 2013, the military briefly re-opened the airport for military use as part of exercise Cerberus Guard.

In March 2014 the government proposed that the airport could re-open for General Aviation users in 2015, and commercial traffic in 2016. Movements would be limited to 22.000 a year under the proposal primarily for noise abatement. However, in June 2014 both the provincial government and the city of Enschede abandoned the plan to re-open the airport for commercial traffic. The future of the airport remained uncertain. In August 2015 it was announced that Belgian aircraft recycling firm Aeronextlife intended to start using the airport to scrap aircraft. As part of the plan, Aeronextlife would become responsible for the costs of certain vital services required for airport operation, such as a fire fighting presence during aircraft operations.

Approval was granted, and flights to Twente Airport resumed on 1 May 2016 with the landing of a Cessna Citation Sovereign coming from Doncaster Sheffield Airport, which departed for Aosta later that day. Besides the arrival of aircraft for scrapping, additional traffic allowed at the airport include cargo aircraft to transport airplane parts, business charter aircraft of a number of operators that requested permission to use the airfield, a limited number of smaller general aviation aircraft and gliders.

In November 2016 it was announced Aircraft End-of-Life Solutions (AELS) was taking over the permit for the dismantling of aircraft from Aeronextlife. AELS already conducted such activity at Woensdrecht Air Base, however, they are limited in the size of the aircraft they can dismantle at Woensdrecht. The first aircraft to be scrapped was HB-JMK, an Airbus A340-300 formerly operated by Swiss International Air Lines, which arrived on 27 April 2017. Since then, aircraft from KLM, Air France and other airlines have also been flown to Twente for scrapping.

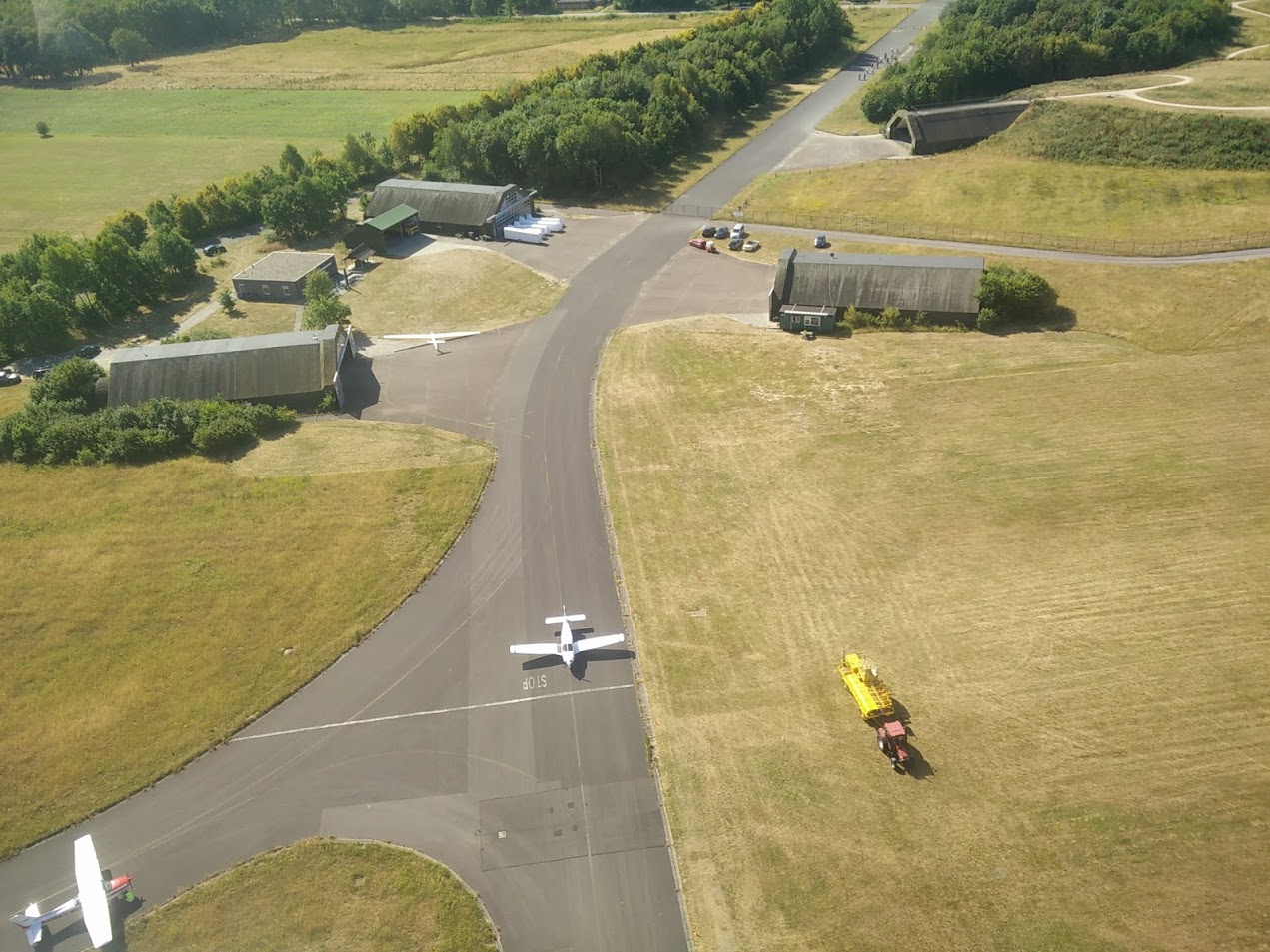
Former military aircraft shelters being used by the local flying club in 2018.

In June and July 2020, due to the COVID-19 pandemic economic downturn, six Lufthansa Boeing 747-400 aircraft arrived at Twente Airport for storage. In October 2020 Lufthansa decided to remove three of the aircraft for scrapping in California but it was discovered that, while local environmental regulations permitted the arrival of large aircraft it did not permit them to take off again. After negotiation a limited exemption from the regulation was agreed and Lufthansa planned to fly the aircraft out, over a period of time, with the last aircraft to leave before July 2021.

On 18 April 2021, the airport was the site of the NN Mission Marathon won by Eliud Kipchoge in 2:04.30. The race was originally scheduled for April 11 in Hamburg but postponed because of Covid-19 restrictions before being relocated to ENS.

Besides the storage and scrapping of aircraft, the airport also worked to establish themselves as an aviation technology hub under the name Technology Base. As an example of this, in September and October of 2021, the airport was used as part of a research project to explore changes to how aircraft approach airports in order to reduce noise and emissions. After several aircraft previously operated by Alitalia were flown to the airport by their owner Nordic Aviation Capital, the company responsible for their maintenance, Direct Maintenance, decided to start aircraft maintenance operations at the airport and started renting office and hangar space in October of 2021.

== Airlines and destinations ==
Currently there are no scheduled flights from and to Twente Airport. Historical destinations include charter flights to Las Palmas, Antalya, Palma de Mallorca, Faro and Heraklion. In the past, KLM Cityhopper has operated shuttle flights twice daily to Schiphol.

Former Charter Airlines are Transavia (Faro, Mallorca, Las Palmas, Bodrum, Antalya, Dalaman) with a Boeing 737-800, Inter Airlines (Antalya) with an Airbus A321. Thomas Cook Airlines (Lourdes) with an Airbus A320. Jetairfly (Lourdes) with a Boeing 737-400. In the year 2005, the airport carried 65,079 passengers, and there were 1050 aircraft movements.

== Ground transport ==
Twente Airport is not accessible to the public and there are subsequently no public transport links. The former passenger terminal is still accessible by car via the nearby A1 motorway, exit 33. The car park is adjacent to the terminal and free of charge.
