= Tarbes–Lourdes–Pyrénées Airport =

Tarbes–Lourdes–Pyrénées Airport Aéroport de Tarbes-Lourdes-Pyrénées
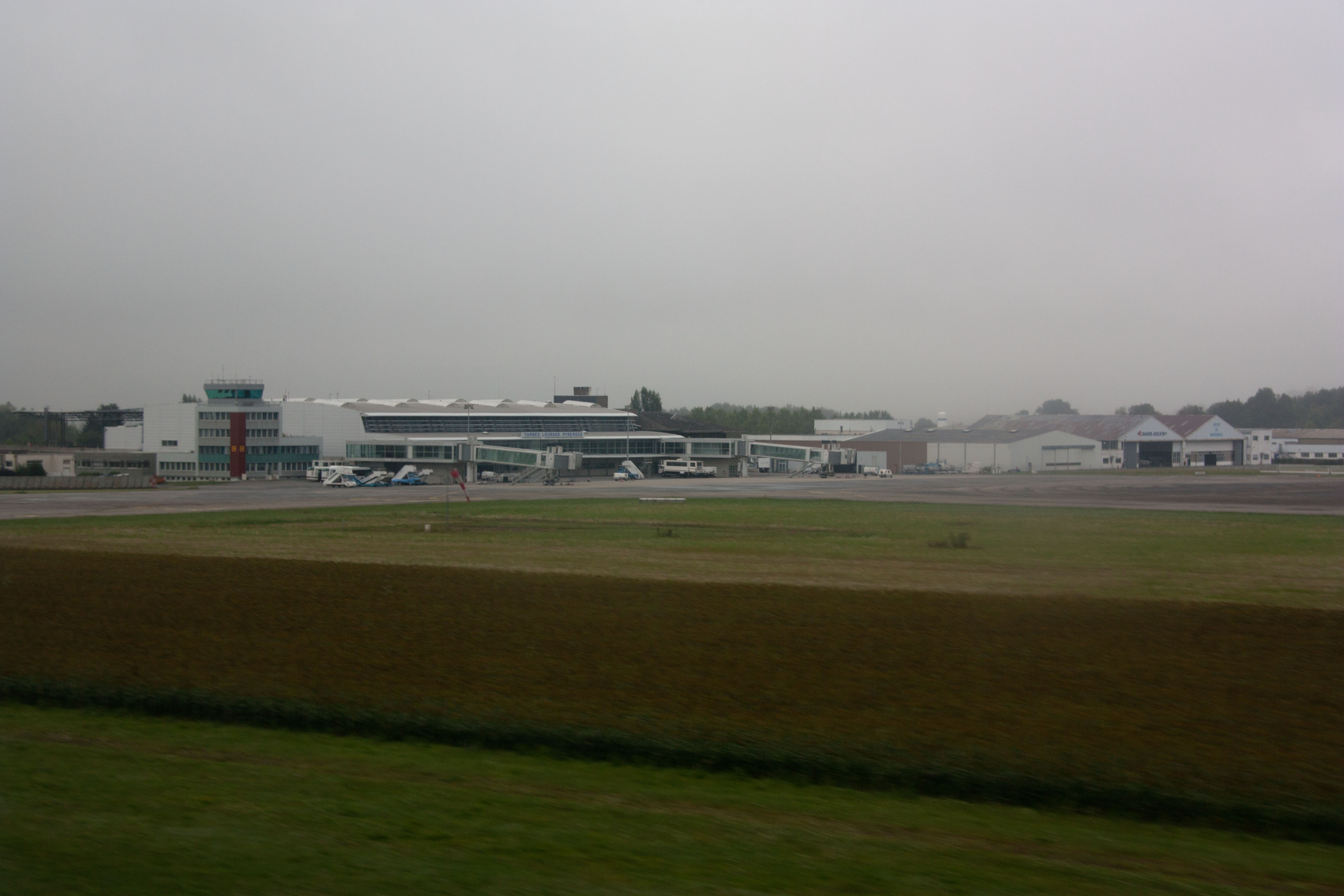
- IATA: LDE; ICAO: LFBT

Summary
- Airport type: Public
- Operator: SNC-Lavalin Aéroport
- Location: Tarbes
- Elevation AMSL: 1,259 ft (384 m)
- Coordinates: 43°11′06″N 000°00′07″W
- Website: tlp.aeroport.fr

Map
- Location of airport in Occitanie region LFBT (France)

Runways
Direction	Length		Surface
Direction	ft	m	Surface
02/20	9,843	3,000	Asphalt

Statistics (2024)
- Passengers: 577,213
- Passenger Change 23-24: ▼2.2%

Tarbes–Lourdes–Pyrénées Airport (French: Aéroport Tarbes Lourdes Pyrénées; IATA: LDE, ICAO: LFBT) is an airport 9 km south-southwest of Tarbes in the Hautes-Pyrénées département of France.

== Operations ==
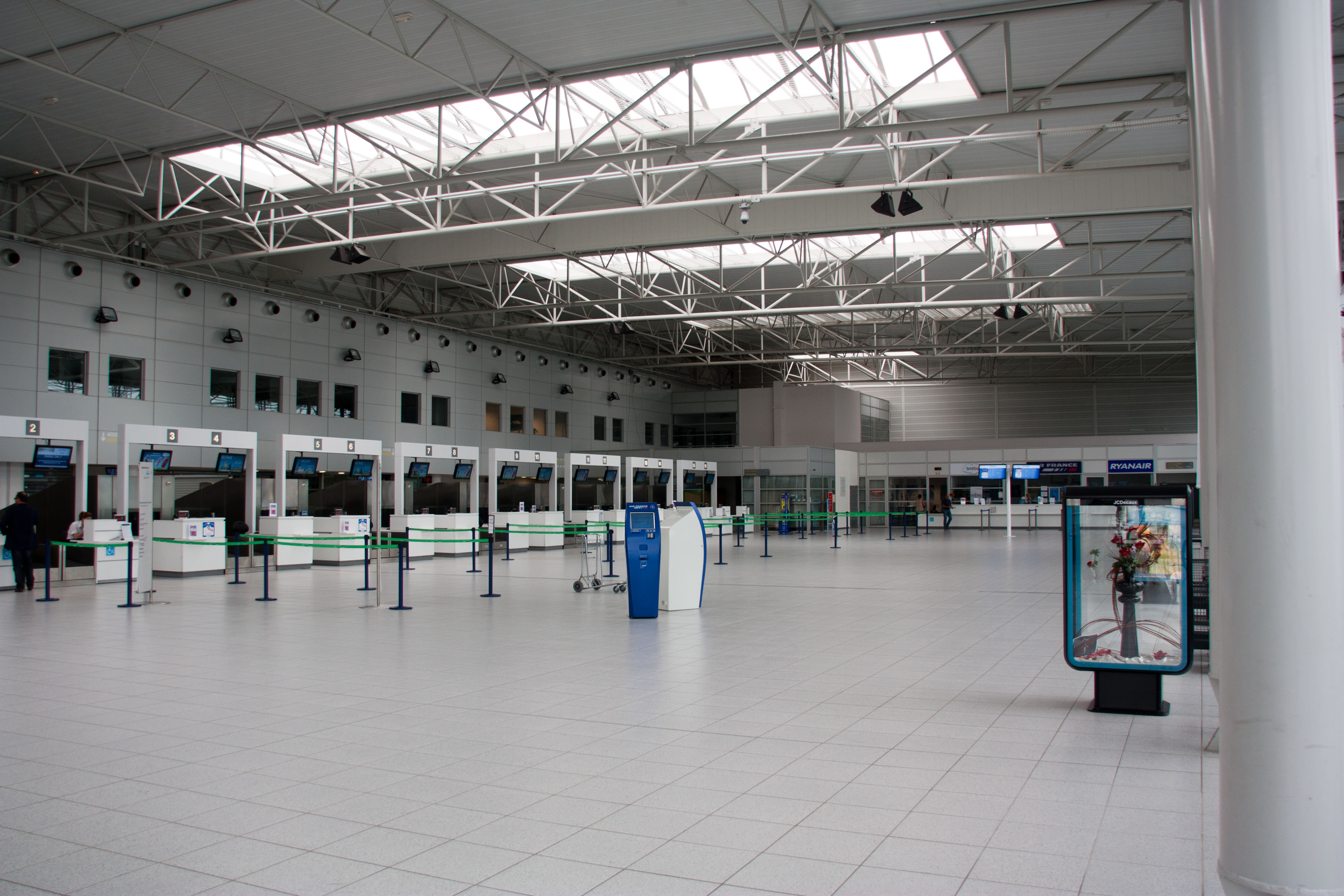
Terminal interior

It handles scheduled and charter flights from across Europe, with many passengers being Catholic pilgrims journeying to nearby Lourdes. The airport can handle large aircraft such as the Boeing 747. The airport is also the site of the Daher light aircraft factory, maker of the TBM single-engine turboprop, as well as aircraft storage facilities operated by Tarmac Aerosave.

== Airlines and destinations ==
The following airlines operate regular scheduled and charter flights to and from the airport:

Airlines	Destinations
Ryanair	London–Stansted, Rome–Ciampino; Seasonal: Bergamo, Charleroi, Dublin, Kraków, Malta
Volotea	Paris–Orly; Seasonal: Catania, Lisbon, Naples, Palermo, Rome–Fiumicino

== Bibliography ==
- French Aeronautical Information Publication for LFBT (PDF) – TARBES LOURDES PYRÉNÉES
