= Boeing 747-400 =

Wide-body airliner, improved production series of the 747

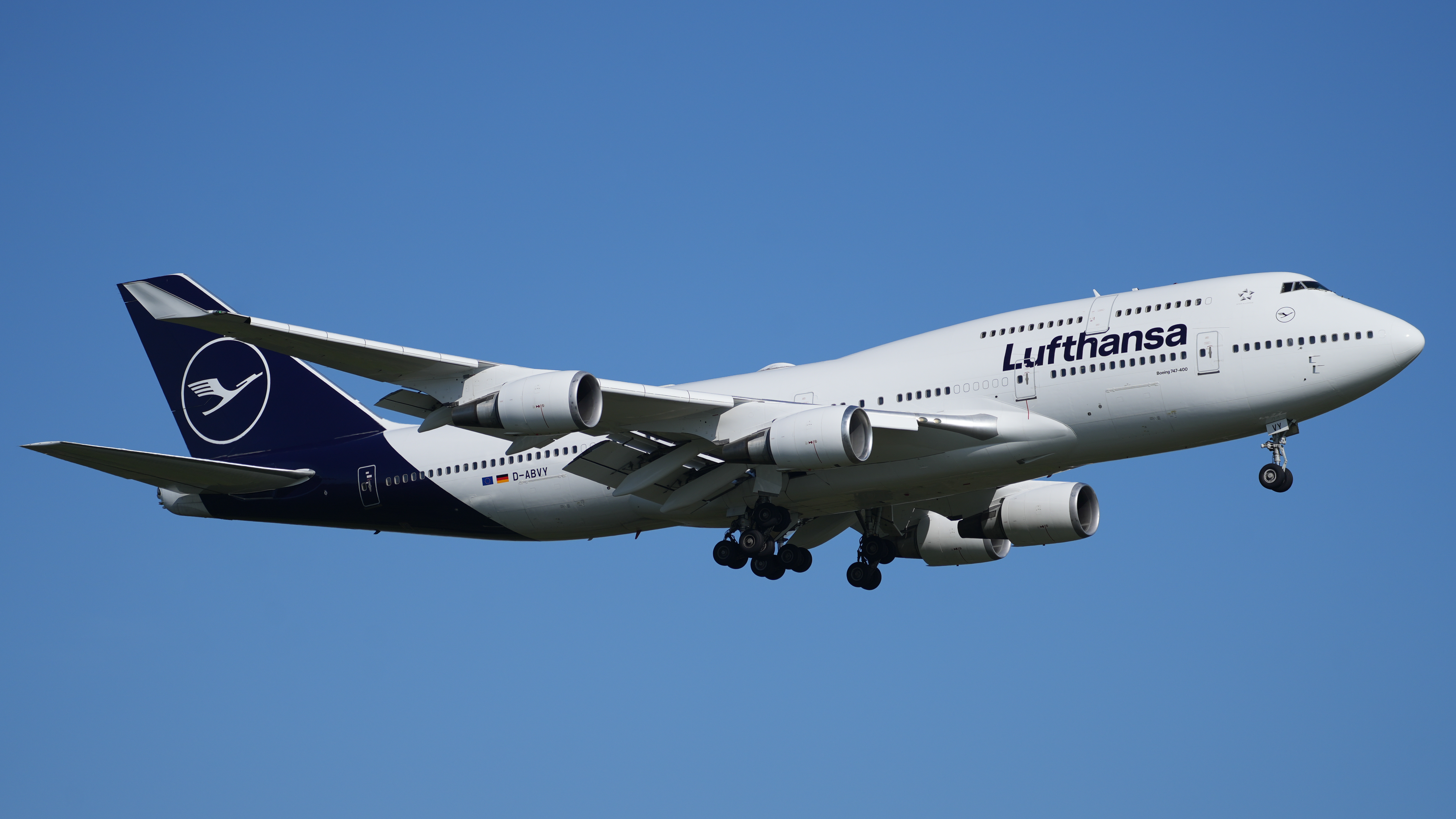
- A 747-400 operated by Lufthansa, its last commercial operator

General information
- Type: Wide-body airliner
- National origin: United States
- Manufacturer: Boeing
- Status: In limited passenger service, in cargo service
- Primary users: Atlas Air: Lufthansa; UPS Airlines; British Airways (historical)
- Number built: 694

History
- Manufactured: Passenger versions: 1988–2005; Freighter versions: 1993–2009; Combi versions: 1989–2002
- Introduction date: February 9, 1989, with Northwest Airlines
- First flight: April 29, 1988
- Developed from: Boeing 747-300
- Variants: Boeing YAL-1; 747 Supertanker; Spirit of Mojave
- Developed into: Boeing Dreamlifter; Boeing 747-8

The Boeing 747-400 is a large, long-range wide-body airliner produced by Boeing Commercial Airplanes, as an advanced version of the original Boeing 747. The model, first introduced as the Advanced Series 300, was announced at the September 1984 Farnborough Airshow, targeting a 10% cost reduction with more efficient engines and 1,000 nautical miles [nmi] (1,900 km; 1,200 mi) range increase. Northwest Airlines became the launch customer with an order for ten aircraft on October 22, 1985. The first 747-400 was rolled out on January 26, 1988, made its maiden flight on April 29, 1988, received type certification on January 9, 1989, and entered service with Northwest a month later on February 9, 1989.

It retains the 747 airframe, including the 747-300 stretched upper deck, with 6-foot (1.8 m) winglets. The 747-400 offers a choice of improved turbofans: the Pratt & Whitney PW4000, General Electric CF6-80C2 or Rolls-Royce RB211-524G/H. Its two-crew glass cockpit dispenses with the need for a flight engineer. It typically accommodates 416 passengers in a three-class layout over a 7,285 nmi (13,492 km; 8,383 mi) range with its 875,000-pound (397 t) maximum takeoff weight (MTOW).

The first -400M combi was rolled out in June 1989. The -400D Domestic for the Japanese market, without winglets, entered service on October 22, 1991. The -400F cargo variant, without the stretched upper deck, was first delivered in May 1993. With an increased MTOW of 910,000 lb (410 t), the extended range version entered service in October 2002 as the -400ERF freighter and the -400ER passenger version the following month. Several 747-400 aircraft have undergone freighter conversion or other modifications to serve as transports of heads of state, YAL-1 laser testbed, engine testbed or the Spirit of Mojave air launcher. The Dreamlifter is an outsize cargo conversion designed to move Dreamliner components.

With 694 delivered over the course of 20 years from 1989 to 2009, it was the most-delivered 747 variant. Its closest competitors were the smaller McDonnell Douglas MD-11 trijet and Airbus A340 quadjet. It has been superseded by the stretched and improved Boeing 747-8, introduced in October 2011. Beginning in the late 2010s, 747-400 passenger aircraft began being phased out by airlines in favor of long-range, wide-body twinjet aircraft, such as the Boeing 777 and Airbus A350.

== Development ==
=== Background ===
The 747-400 kept the 747 general configuration, with the 747-300 stretched upper deck and additional winglets

Following its introduction in 1969, the Boeing 747 became a major success with airlines and the flying public. As the world's first wide-body jetliner, the 747 enabled significantly higher passenger capacities on long-range routes. Boeing sold over 1,500 747s across all variants, making it the most-produced wide-body jetliner of its era. In 1980, Boeing announced the 747-300, its latest 747 variant featuring greater passenger capacity. This was made possible by making a stretched upper deck (SUD), previously an option on the 747-200, a standard feature. The SUD was almost twice as long as the original 747 upper deck. Besides increased capacity, the 747-300 did not offer any increase in range, nor did it include improvements in flight deck technology or construction materials. At the same time, 747s were becoming more costly to operate due to several factors, notably conventional flight control systems, three-person flight crews, and fuel costs.

In 1982, Boeing introduced a two-crew glass cockpit, new engines, and advanced materials on its 757 and 767 twinjets. At the same time, combined sales of the 747-100, −200, −300, and 747SP models (collectively referred to as the 747 "Classics") exceeded 700, but new orders slowed precipitously. The introduction of the 747-300 did little to stem the decline, and itself faced potential competition from more modern designs. As a result, Boeing began considering a more significant upgrade for its largest passenger jet.

By early 1984, company officials had identified five development objectives for the latest 747 upgrade: new technologies, an enhanced interior, a 1,000-nautical-mile (1,900 km; 1,200 mi) range increase, more efficient engines, and a 10 percent reduction in operating cost. In September 1984, Boeing announced development of the newest 747 derivative, the "Advanced Series 300", at the Farnborough Airshow. On October 22, 1985, the type was officially launched when Northwest Airlines became the first 747-400 customer, with an order for 10 aircraft. Cathay Pacific, KLM, Lufthansa, Singapore Airlines, and British Airways also announced orders several months later, followed by United Airlines, Air France, Malaysia Airlines and Japan Airlines.

=== Design effort ===
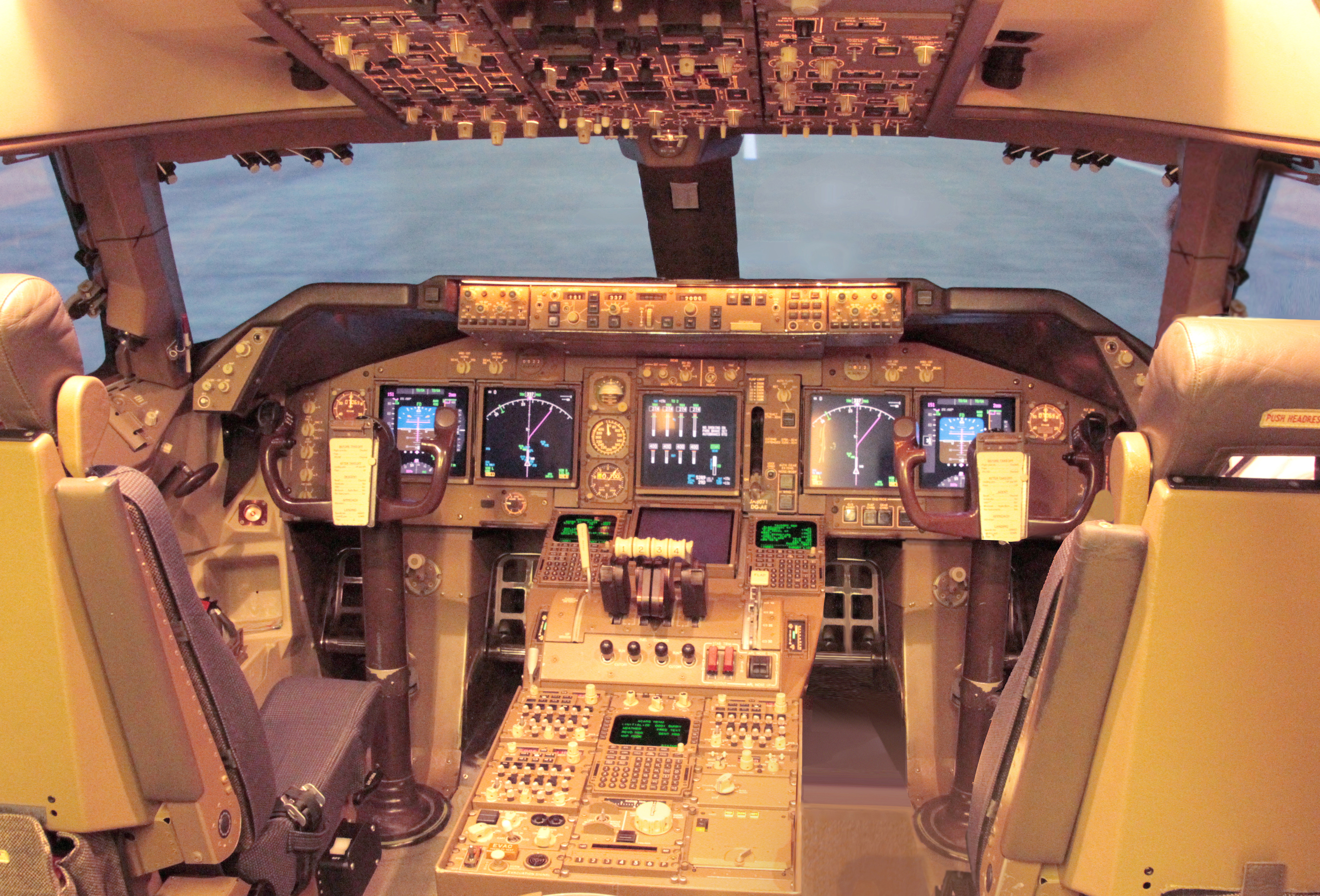
The computerized glass cockpit of the Boeing 747-400ER

Seven early customers, namely British Airways, Cathay Pacific, KLM, Lufthansa, Northwest, Qantas and Singapore Airlines, formed a consultative group to advise Boeing on the 747-400's design process. While the aircraft was planned as a new-technology upgrade, Boeing originally proposed minimal design changes to reduce development cost and retain commonality with existing models. The airline consultative group sought more advanced changes, including a two-crew glass cockpit. As a result of airline input, the 747-400's new digital cockpit design featured cathode-ray tube (CRT) display technologies first employed on the 757 and 767. The autopilot was also changed to that of the 757 and 767; on the 747-400 a software update was added to allow an 'altitude intervention' mode.

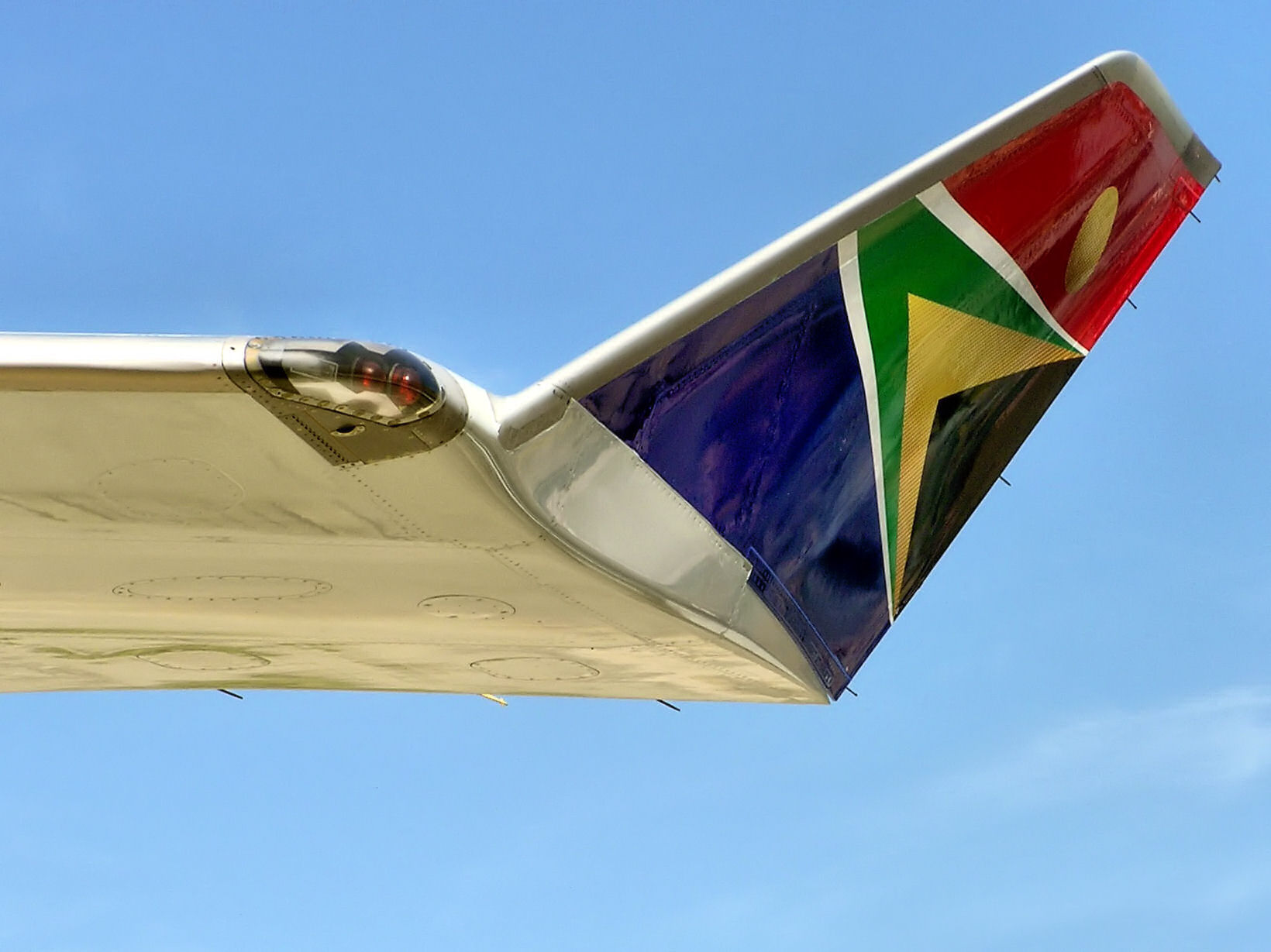
The added canted winglet of South African Airways 747-400

The 747-400's wingspan was stretched by 17 feet (5.2 m) over the Classic 747 through wingtip extensions. For reduced aerodynamic drag, the wings were fitted with 6-foot (1.8-metre) tall winglets. Despite the added length, the wings were 6,000 pounds (2,700 kg) lighter as a result of new aluminum alloys. The horizontal tail was also redesigned to fit a 3,300-US-gallon (12,000 L) fuel tank, resulting in a 350-nautical-mile (650 km; 400 mi) range increase, and the rudder travel was increased to 30 degrees to enhance directional control during crosswind operations and high-speed flight. The landing gear was redesigned with larger wheels and carbon brakes. Internal changes further included a restyled cabin with new materials and updated fittings.

New engines offered on the 747-400 included the Pratt & Whitney PW4056, the General Electric CF6-80C2B1F, and the Rolls-Royce RB211-524G/H. The engines offered lower fuel consumption and greater thrust, along with a full-authority digital engine control (FADEC) which adjusted engine performance for improved efficiency compared with the Classic 747s. A new auxiliary power unit (APU) manufactured by Pratt & Whitney Canada was also selected to provide on-ground power for the 747-400, with a 40 percent reduction in fuel consumption compared to previous APU designs.

=== Production and testing ===
Final assembly of the first 747-400 began at Boeing's Everett factory, the longtime site of 747 production, in September 1987. More than fifty percent of the aircraft was produced by subcontractors, with major structures, engine nacelles, and sub-assemblies supplied by Northrop, and upper deck fuselage frames from Daewoo. All components were integrated during the final assembly process at the Everett factory. The first aircraft, equipped with PW4056 engines, was completed over the winter months of late 1987. On January 26, 1988, the first 747-400 rolled out at the Everett factory, while the first 737-400 rolled out at Boeing's Renton factory on the same day, marking the first double jetliner rollout in the manufacturer's history. By the time of the rollout, the 747-400 program had amassed more than 100 orders.

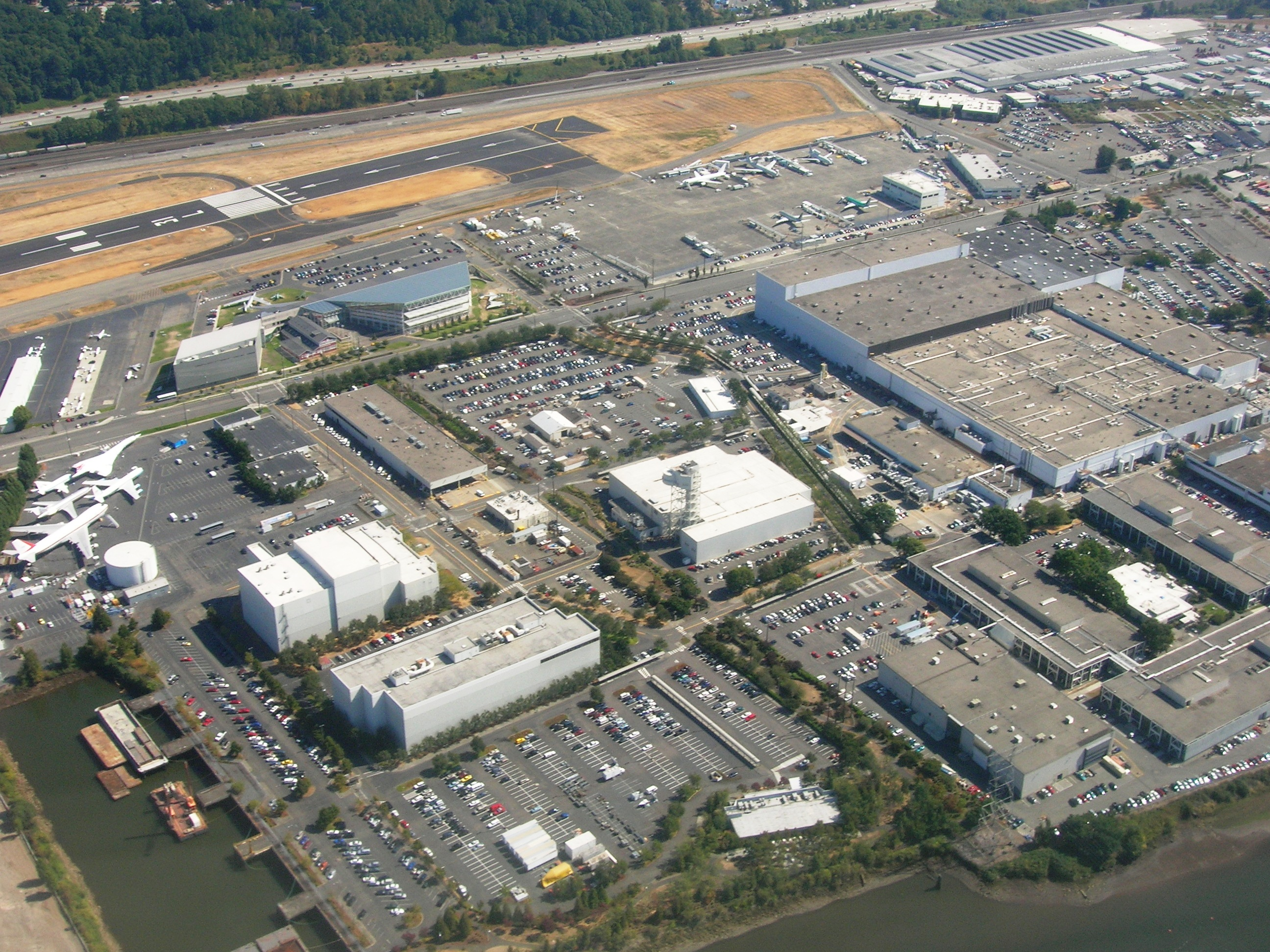
An aerial view of Boeing Field, one of the sites used for 747-400 flight testing.

The 747-400 flew for the first time on April 29, 1988, under the command of test pilot James Loesch and co-pilot Kenneth Higgins. The first flight was six weeks behind schedule, owing to subcontractor delays in supplying components, and extra troubleshooting on the aircraft's electronics systems. The maiden flight took off from Paine Field, site of the Everett factory, and landed at Boeing Field, south of Seattle, after an uneventful 2 hours and 26 minutes. The 747-400's flight test program used the first four aircraft built, one more than the minimum number necessary to certify the aircraft's three engine options. One test aircraft each was fitted with the CF6-80C2B1F and RB211-524G/H engines, while the other two featured PW4056 engines, with the fourth aircraft serving as a backup. Federal Aviation Administration (FAA) certification was received on January 9, 1989, with Pratt & Whitney PW4000 engines, May 18, 1989, with General Electric CF6-80C2s and June 8, 1989, with Rolls-Royce RB211-524Gs.

As the flight test program proceeded, Boeing encountered problems in the 747-400's production process, leading it to disclose delivery delays of up to one month for the first 20 aircraft built. A primary reason for the delays was the unprecedented complexity of interior configurations offered to airlines, which ranged from lavatory and galley locations to the color shades of cabin warning labels. Coupled with new, relatively inexperienced workers, a lack of veteran technicians, interior configurations needing costly re-work, and integration challenges with the advanced flight deck systems, 747-400 production fell behind schedule. The company managed to resolve early production issues by mid-1989, with the first example airframes of all three engine variants delivered within four months of each other, and overall delays not exceeding several weeks.

== Service entry and operations ==
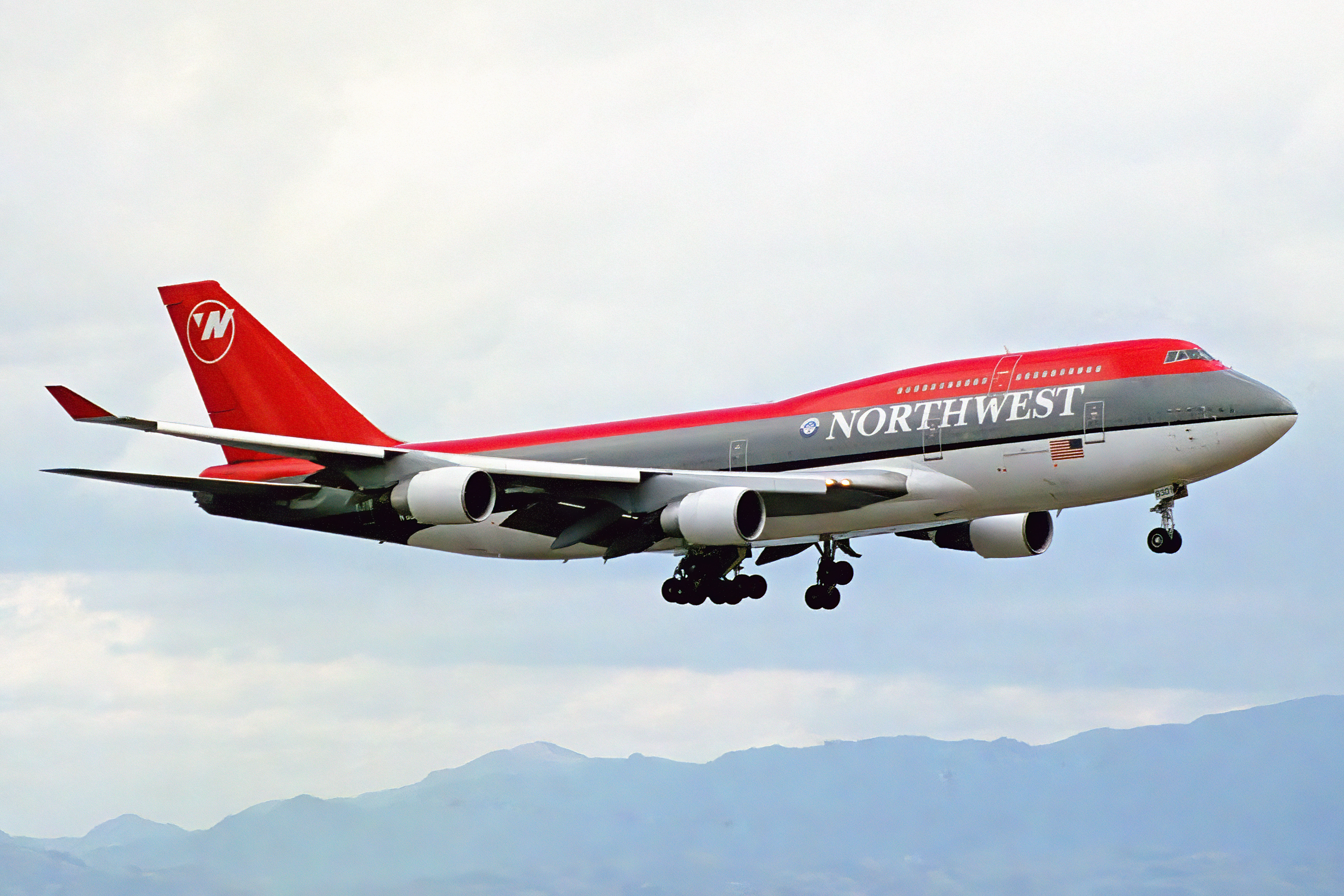
Northwest Airlines placed the 747-400 into service in February 1989. This aircraft is the prototype of the 747-400

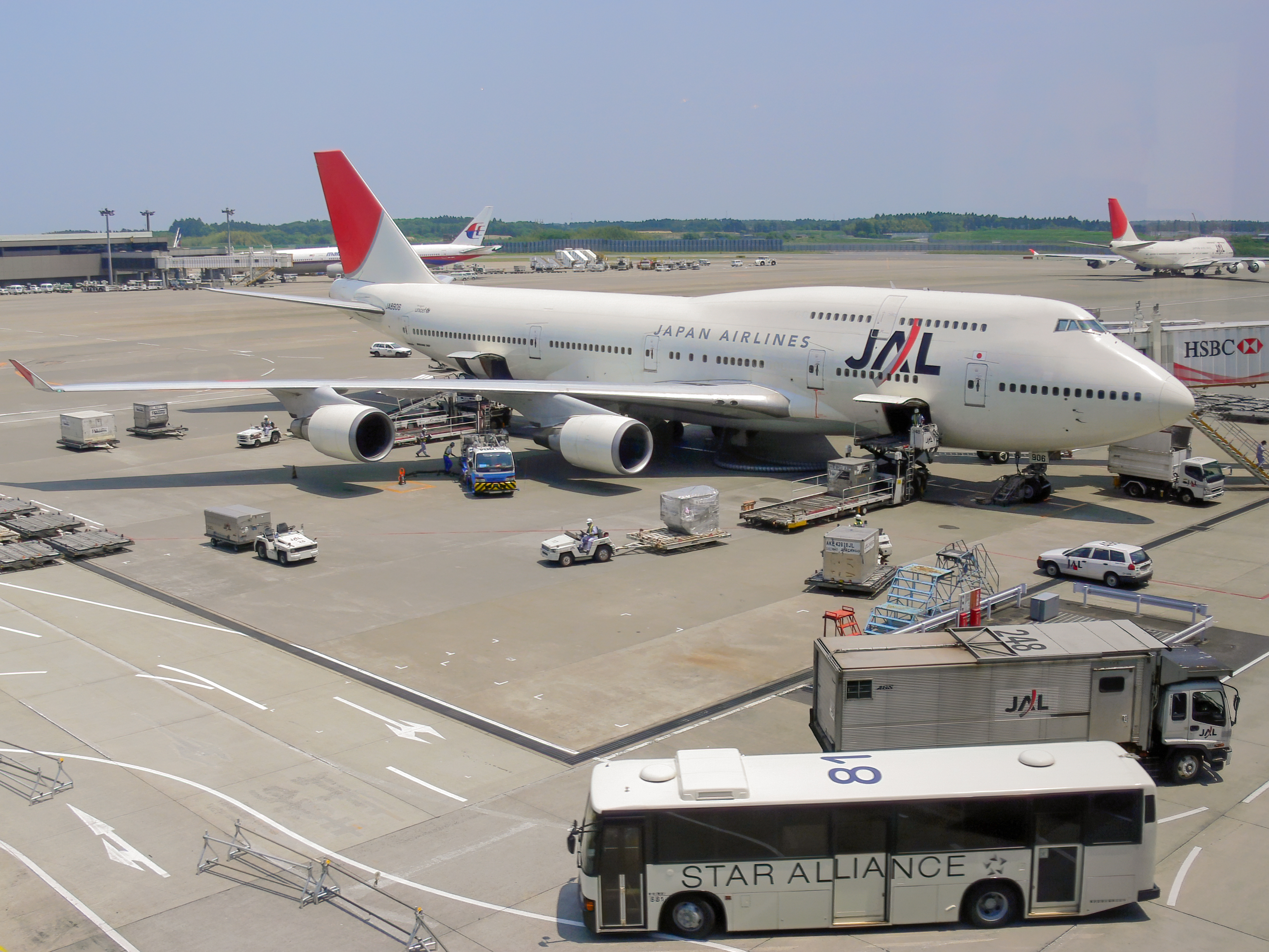
Japan Airlines introduced the Boeing 747-400 into its fleet in 1990.

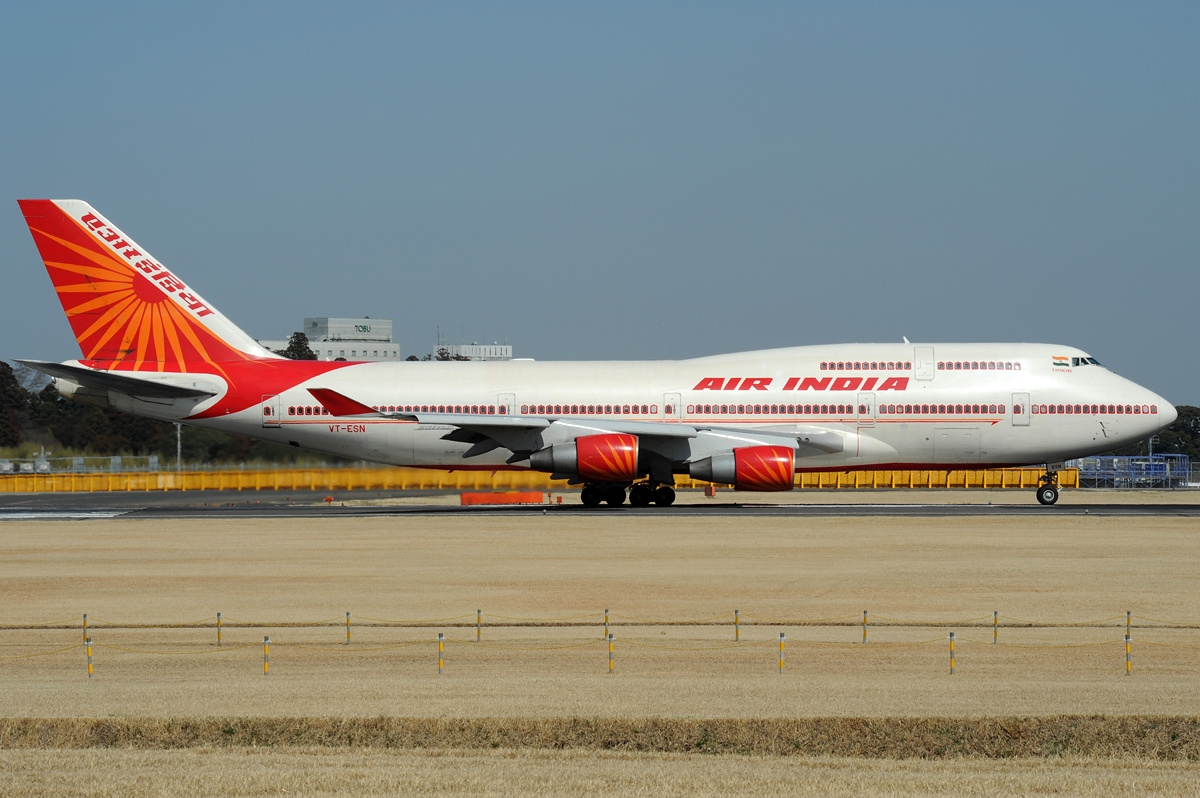
Air India began operating the 747-400 in 1993.

The first 747-400 (N661US) was delivered to launch customer Northwest Airlines. This jet became known for an incident in 2002 when, as Northwest Airlines Flight 85, the jet suffered a rudder hardover. N661US was later sold to Delta Air Lines when Northwest merged with it. N661US later became preserved at the Delta Flight Museum. This was the 20th anniversary of the 747-100's first flight. On May 31, 1989, Singapore Airlines operated the first international service using a 747-400, on a flight from Singapore to London.

In May 1989, one week before the initial delivery to the 747-400's first European customer, KLM, the Joint Aviation Authorities (JAA) shocked Boeing by refusing to grant regulatory certification for the aircraft, citing the upper deck cabin floor's resistance to collapse in the event of a sudden decompression. While the manufacturer asserted that the 747-400's cabin floor was no different from the already-certified and in-service 747-300, the JAA maintained that the newer model would have a service life into 2020 and beyond and was thus subject to a newer, more stringent standard which had been updated to reflect the risk of explosive devices. In the days leading up to the first delivery to KLM, negotiations between Boeing, the FAA, and the JAA resulted in a compromise: a temporary operating certificate would be issued for the 747-400, provided that the manufacturer develop a structural retrofit for the aircraft within two years. The last-minute deal allowed KLM and Lufthansa to take delivery of their 747-400s without further delays.

After the first 747-400 deliveries, Boeing began production on more variants of the aircraft. The first 747-400 Combi, able to carry both passengers and freight, was rolled out in June 1989. The 747-400 Domestic, a short-range variant of the aircraft designed for Japanese intra-island services, first flew on March 18, 1991, and entered service with Japan Airlines on October 22, 1991. A cargo variant, the 747-400F, was first delivered in May 1993 to Cargolux. By the end of the 1990s, Boeing was producing four versions of the 747-400.

=== Further developments ===
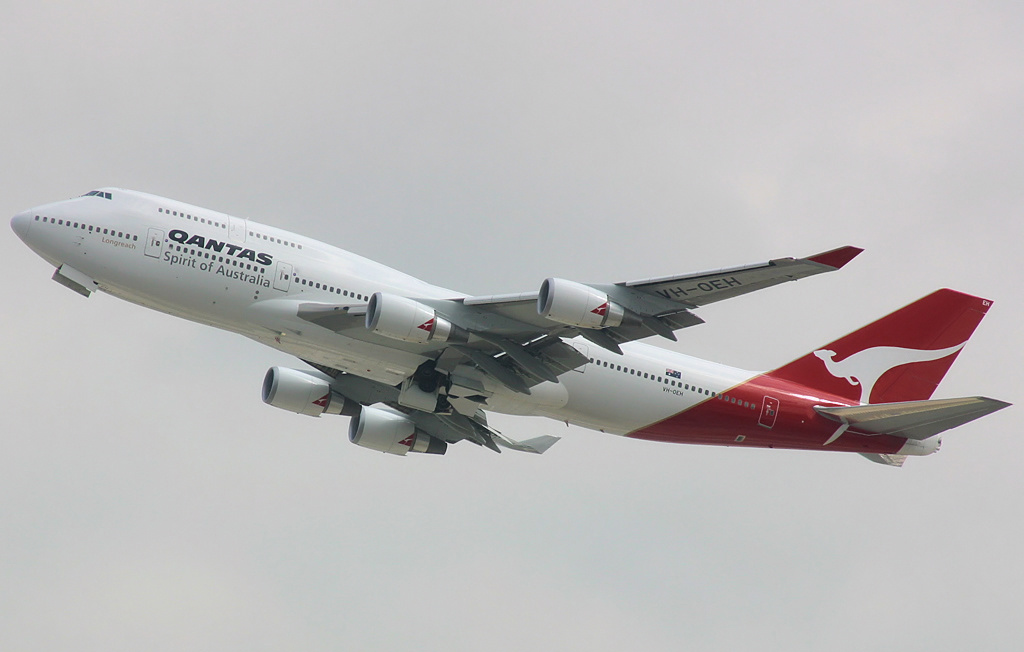
Qantas placed the Boeing 747-400ER into service in November 2002

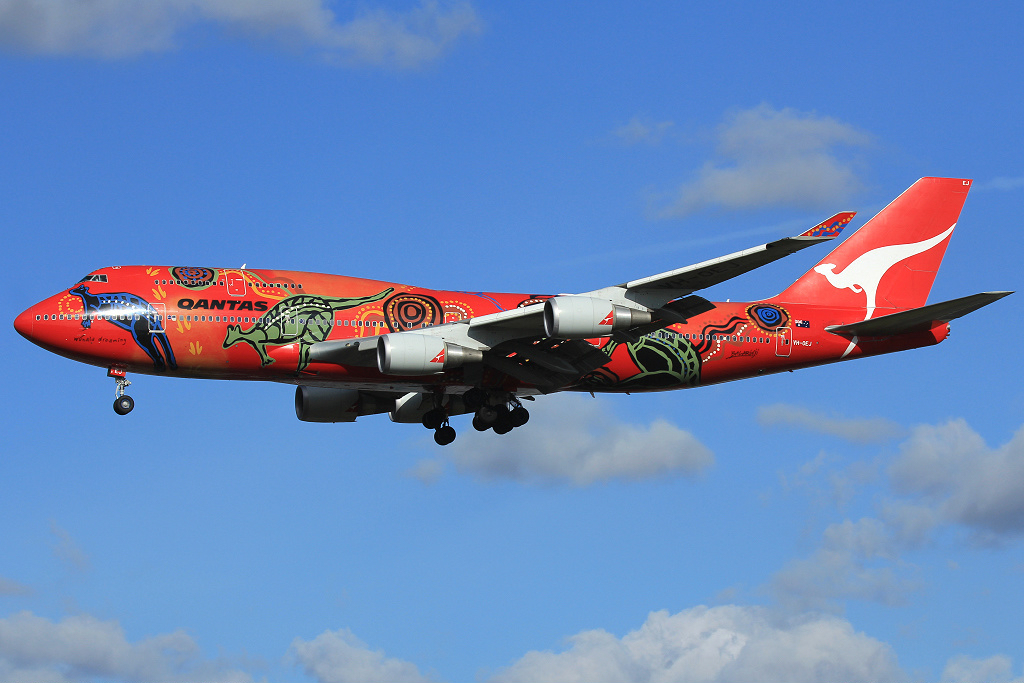
Qantas also painted one their 747-400ERs in the "Wunala Dreaming" livery.

The extended range freighter (ERF) entered service in October 2002. The next month, the extended range (ER) passenger version entered service with Qantas, the only airline ever to order the passenger version of the 747-400ER. Qantas initially used the 747-400ER for the Melbourne to Los Angeles and Dallas to Sydney route allowing the completion of the flight with full passenger load and cargo. Before the 747-400ER, Qantas would complete such flights by blocking out the 'E' zone of the cabin and limiting passenger numbers and cargo. The 747-400ER featured the Boeing Signature Interior, which was later made available on the 747-400 (either as a retrofit on existing 747-400s or factory installation on new frames).

The 747-400ER also introduced some flight deck enhancements, including liquid-crystal displays (LCDs), which replaced the six cathode-ray tube (CRT) displays found on the Boeing 747-400. LCDs later became standard on the 747-400 as well, and could be retrofitted to earlier aircraft. The three standby flight displays found on the 747-400 were also replaced by a single combined LCD, the integrated standby flight display (ISFD), which also became standard on the 747-400 in late 2003.

In the 2000s, several 747-400 operators tested alternative fuels. Air New Zealand conducted the first commercial flight using jatropha-derived fuel in 2008, with one engine burning a 50/50 blend of jatropha and jet fuel. Continental Airlines tested jatropha oil in one of its airliners on January 7, 2009. Jatropha is easy to grow, needs little fertilizer or water, and produces an oil-rich plant.

Production of the 747-400 passenger version officially ceased on March 15, 2007. The last four -400s on order were cancelled by Philippine Airlines (which switched to the 777-300ER). The last to order the -400 was China Airlines in November 2002, with the last passenger 747-400 constructed in 2005 and delivered in April of that year. It was the 1358th 747 (MSN33737/B-18215). The last 747-400 was a -400ERF delivered on December 22, 2009, to Kalitta Air.

=== Retirement and economic value ===
The 747-400, alongside the smaller Airbus A340 quadjet and MD-11 trijet, each have more than two engines making them relatively expensive to operate, although their main appeal during the early 1990s was their long range as well as high capacity, with the 747-400 being the most successful of the three. At that time, the existing medium wide-body twinjets Boeing 767 and Airbus A330 were not considered direct competitors with lesser range and lower capacity. Since then there has been the development of wide-body twin-engine aircraft that could achieve similar range and payload to the 747-400 while also providing better fuel economy. Such large twinjets like the Boeing 777, Boeing 787 Dreamliner, and Airbus A350 XWB have entered service since the late 1990s onward, and these have taken over routes previously flown by 747-400s, as reducing capacity improved load factors. The change in emphasis from hub and spoke operations to point-to-point flights has also reduced the need for jumbo jets (very large aircraft (VLA) with more than 400 seats) like the 747 and Airbus A380. Airlines such as British Airways and Qantas that plan to maintain the same capacity on routes currently served by 747-400s did not order the updated 747-8 but instead opted for the Airbus A380. A contributing factor for the drop in resale value and retirement of the 747-400 has been the 2008 financial crisis, which spiked an increase in fuel prices, that caused a drop in air travel demand. The 747-400's leasing, resale and salvage value have dropped steeply since the 2010s. By that time many 747-400s were also more than 20 years old, so airlines have accelerated their retirement.

For example, Delta Air Lines reduced the number of flights it operated from the United States to Narita International Airport that were intended to transfer passengers to other destinations in Asia, switching to twin-engine widebody aircraft operating from an expanded hub at Seattle-Tacoma International Airport. Total capacity was cut, but load factors improved. In April 2015, Delta announced it would accelerate the retirement of its 747-400s and replace them either with Airbus A330 or Airbus A350 aircraft (both of which are twinjets). Delta could not keep the 747s full without deeply discounting ticket prices; the discounts and increased maintenance required of a four-engine aircraft led to a drag on profits.

Since the cost of replacing a 747-400 is high (an airline must purchase or lease another wide-body), some operators choose to fly the 747-400 to the conclusion of its accepted useful life and then scrap it. The current parts resale value for this aircraft has been reduced to its engines. When a 26-year-old 747-400 owned by Delta flew through a violent hailstorm, the company indicated it was likely the aircraft would be scrapped. George Dimitroff, head of valuations for FlightGlobal, estimated the aircraft's value before the incident at about $8 million. He noted that this was not the same as its insured value. As discussed in the section on 747-400 converted freighters, there is no longer a viable economic model for converting retired passenger 747-400 aircraft into dedicated freighters, so most retired passenger aircraft will likely be scrapped.

Several airlines have retired their 747-400s from the trans-Pacific market since the early 2010s. Remaining operators in 2014 included EVA Air, Qantas, Virgin Atlantic, British Airways, and United Airlines. United's deployment of them also reflected a change in emphasis from Asian hubs to domestic hubs. On January 11, 2017, United announced it would begin phasing out its 747-400s and made its last 747 flight on November 7 that year. Delta Air Lines was the last US airline to operate the Boeing 747, retiring the last of the 747-400 fleet it inherited from Northwest Airlines in December 2017.

=== Impact of the COVID-19 pandemic ===
Before COVID-19, British Airways, the largest passenger 747-400 operator at the time, announced in February 2019 that its 747-400 fleet would retire by February 2024, replacing it with the Airbus A350-1000. Lufthansa was to retire its 747-400 fleet in 2025 as it was to be replaced by the Boeing 777X and the Boeing 747-8I. KLM planned to retire their 747-400 Combi and Passenger fleet in 2020 as they were being replaced by the Boeing 777-300ER, the Boeing 787-10, and the Airbus A350-900. However, KLM retired the 747 from passenger service on October 25, 2020.

The global COVID-19 pandemic hastened the retirement of many remaining passenger Boeing 747-400s due to a sharp decline in passenger traffic. For instance, KLM retired its Boeing 747-400 Combi and Passenger fleets in March 2020. Qantas announced the retirement of its 747-400 and 747-400ER fleet by the end of 2020, with the Boeing 787-9 Dreamliner taking its place. China Airlines also announced that it would be retiring its remaining four passenger Boeing 747-400s by the end of 2020 due to the COVID-19 pandemic (which were delivered between 2004 and 2005, operating on flights within Asia), with the Airbus A350-900 and Boeing 777-300ER taking over all high-volume routes and all Asian International routes. However, China Airlines didn't retire its last passenger Boeing 747-400 until February 2021. British Airways retired its remaining 31 Boeing 747-400s 4 years ahead of the original February 2024 deadline. Virgin Atlantic also retired their remaining leisure fleet 747-400s in May 2020 citing the COVID-19 pandemic - the fleet was due to retire in 2021. As of September, 2021, there were just 42 passenger 747-400 in operation (10 actively flying, 32 in storage) across 10 carriers worldwide.

On 29 April 2022, Air India retired its remaining 4 747-400 planes in its fleet after the Directorate General of Civil Aviation deregistered them, and sold them to Aersale in April 2024 to convert 2 to freighters and scrap the rest. In March 2024, Asiana Airlines announced it would retire its sole remaining 747-400, leaving Air China as the last scheduled passenger operator in Asia.

== Design ==
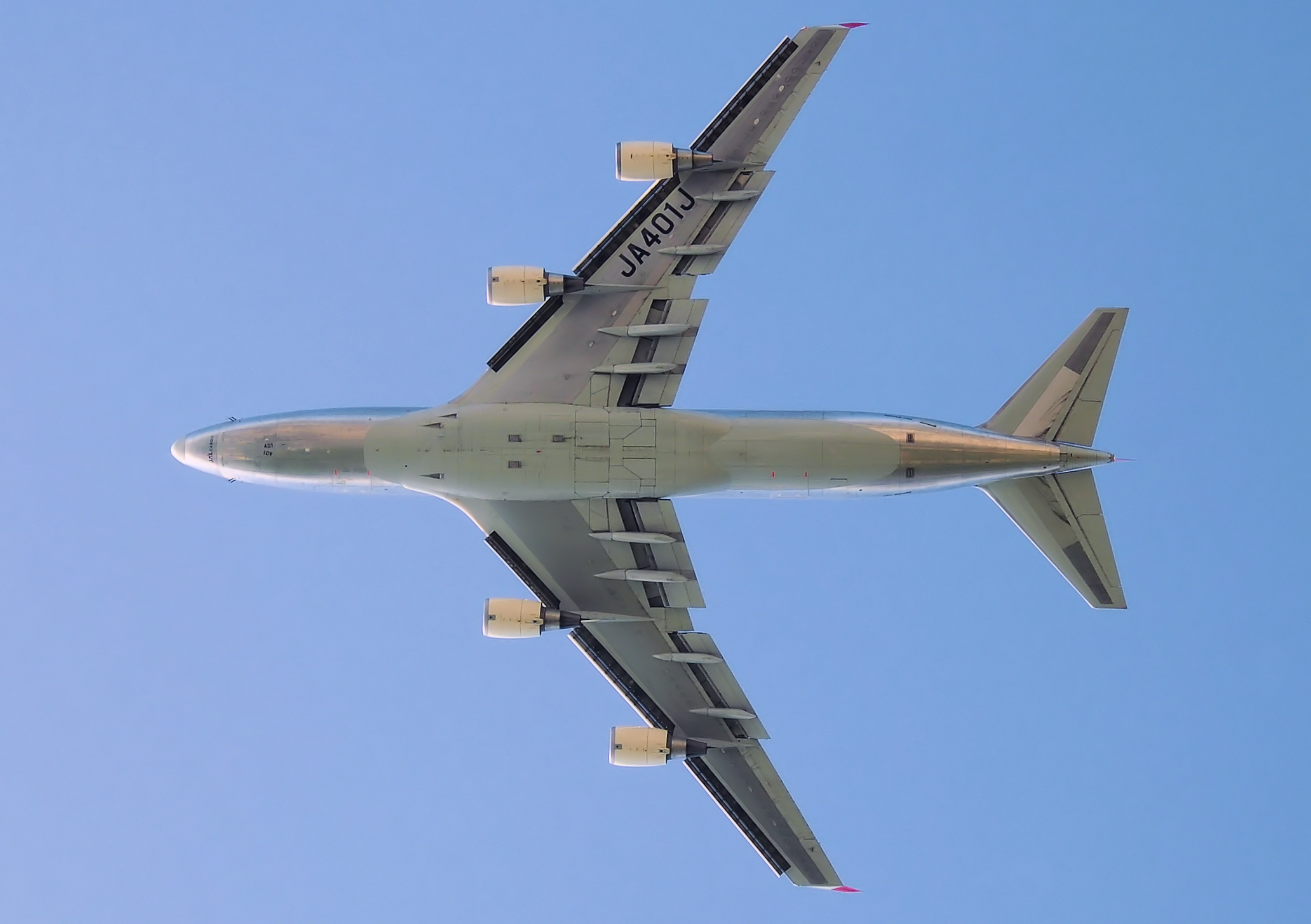
The wing is similar to previous variants, extended and with winglets

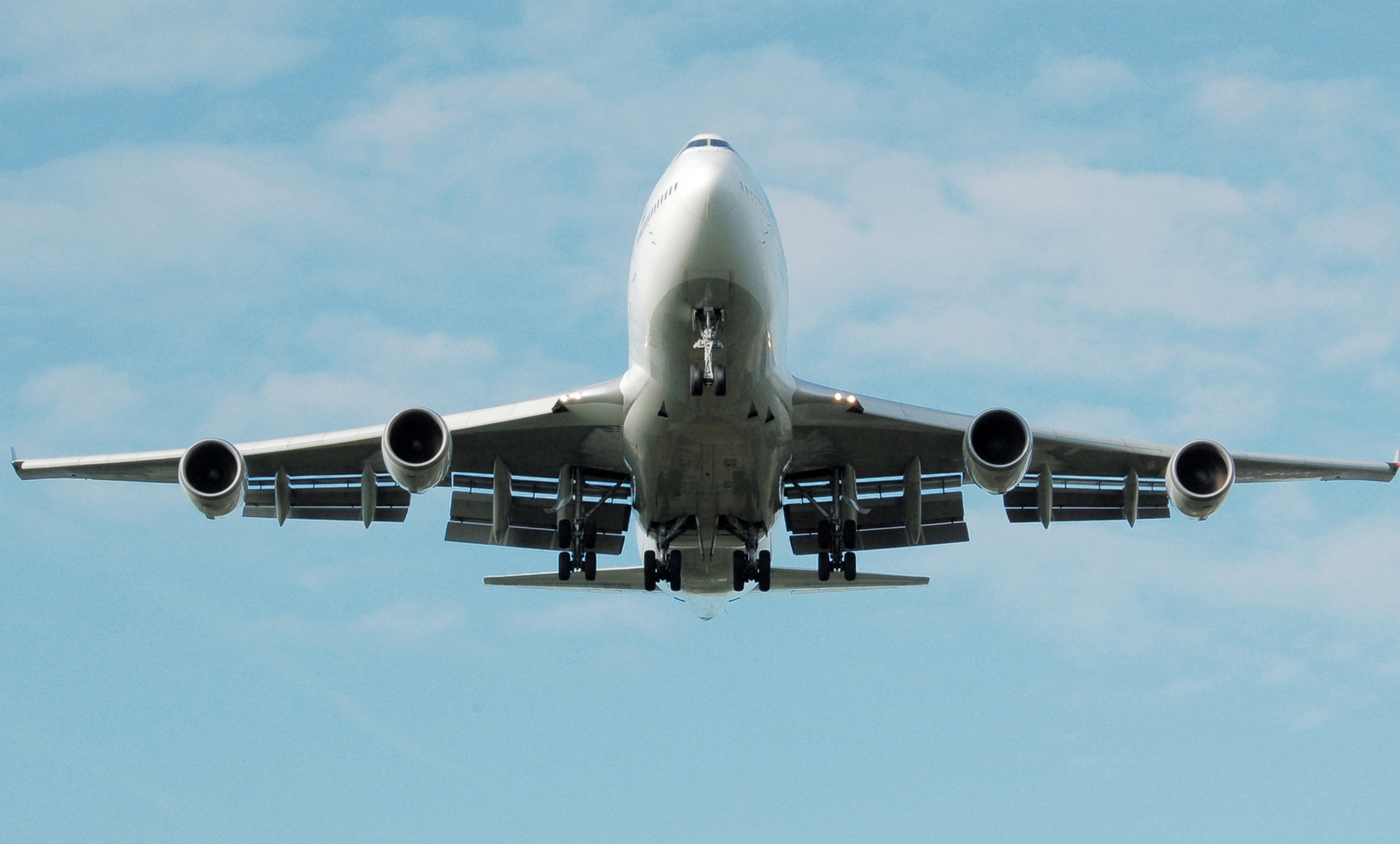
Triple-slotted trailing edge flaps

The 747-400's airframe features extended and lighter wings than the previous 747s, capped by winglets. The winglets result in a 3 percent increase in long-range cruise, improved takeoff performance, and higher cruise altitudes. The extended wingspan also gains an additional leading edge flap section. When unfurnished, the basic 747-400 fuselage is lighter than preceding models, but when fitted out it is heavier and stronger than previous models. The landing gear uses the same configuration as the previous 747s, but with carbon brakes replacing the previous steel ones, and overall weight savings of 1,800 pounds (820 kg).

The 747-400's glass cockpit features CRT displays which show flight instrumentation along with engine indication and crew alerting system (EICAS) diagnostics. The flight engineer station on the previous 747s is no longer installed, and the new displays and simplified layout results in a two-thirds reduction of switches, lights, and gauges versus the Classic 747. Other new systems include an advanced Honeywell flight management computer (FMC) which assists pilots in calculating optimal altitudes and routes along with a Rockwell-Collins central maintenance computer (CMC) which automates troubleshooting tasks.

The redesigned 747-400 interior features new cabin sidewalls, heat-resistant phenolic glass and carbon composite paneling, and larger storage bins. An enhanced in-flight entertainment framework, called the Advanced Cabin Entertainment/Service System (ACESS), debuted on the 747-400, which integrates 18-channel audio capability, four-passenger intercom announcement zones, inter-cabin telephones, and passenger lighting into a central system. An eight-bunk overhead crew rest is installed above the aft cabin, while a second crew rest area is located on the upper deck behind the cockpit for flight crew use.

The last few 747-400s delivered feature the Boeing Signature Interior, derived from the Boeing 777.

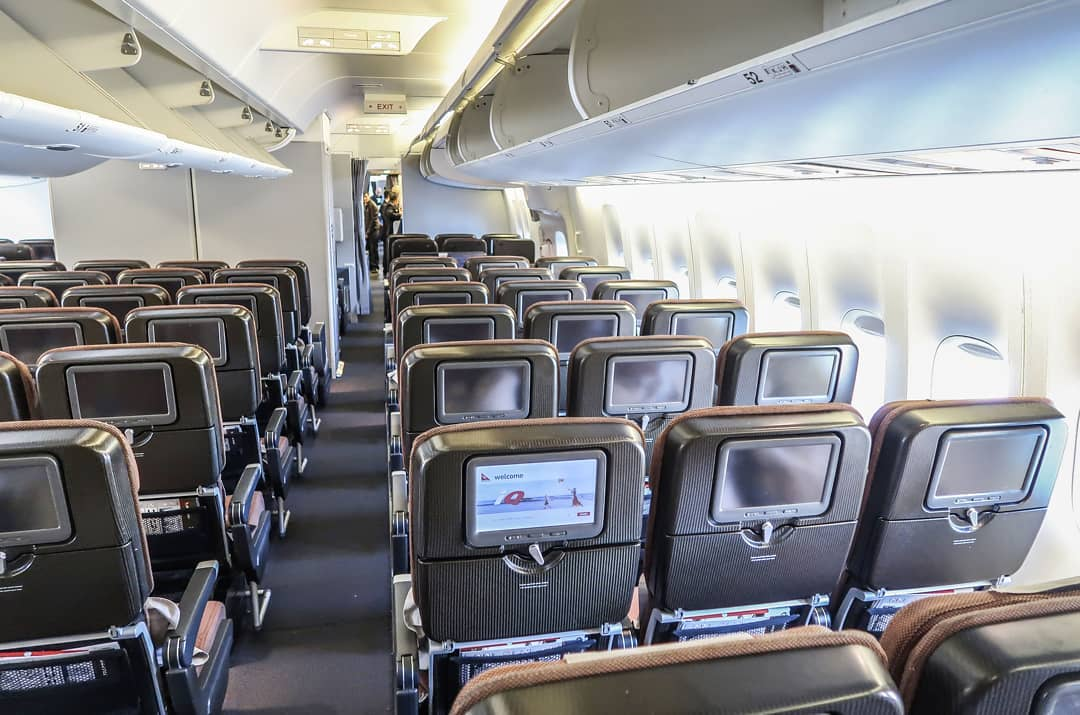
Qantas 747-400 main deck economy class cabin

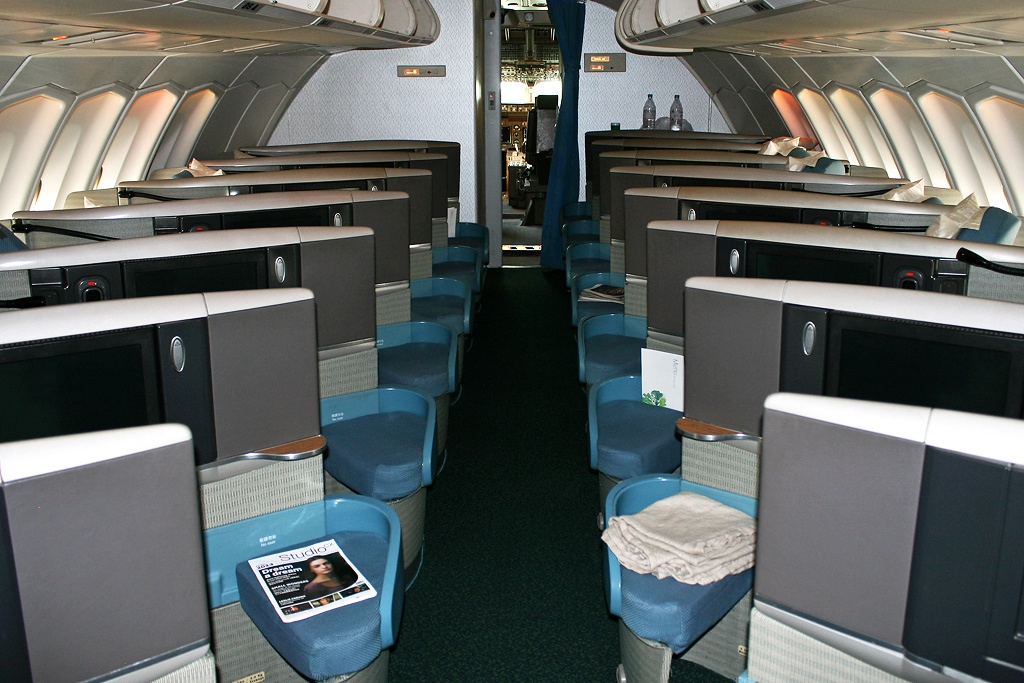
Cathay Pacific 747-400 upper deck business class

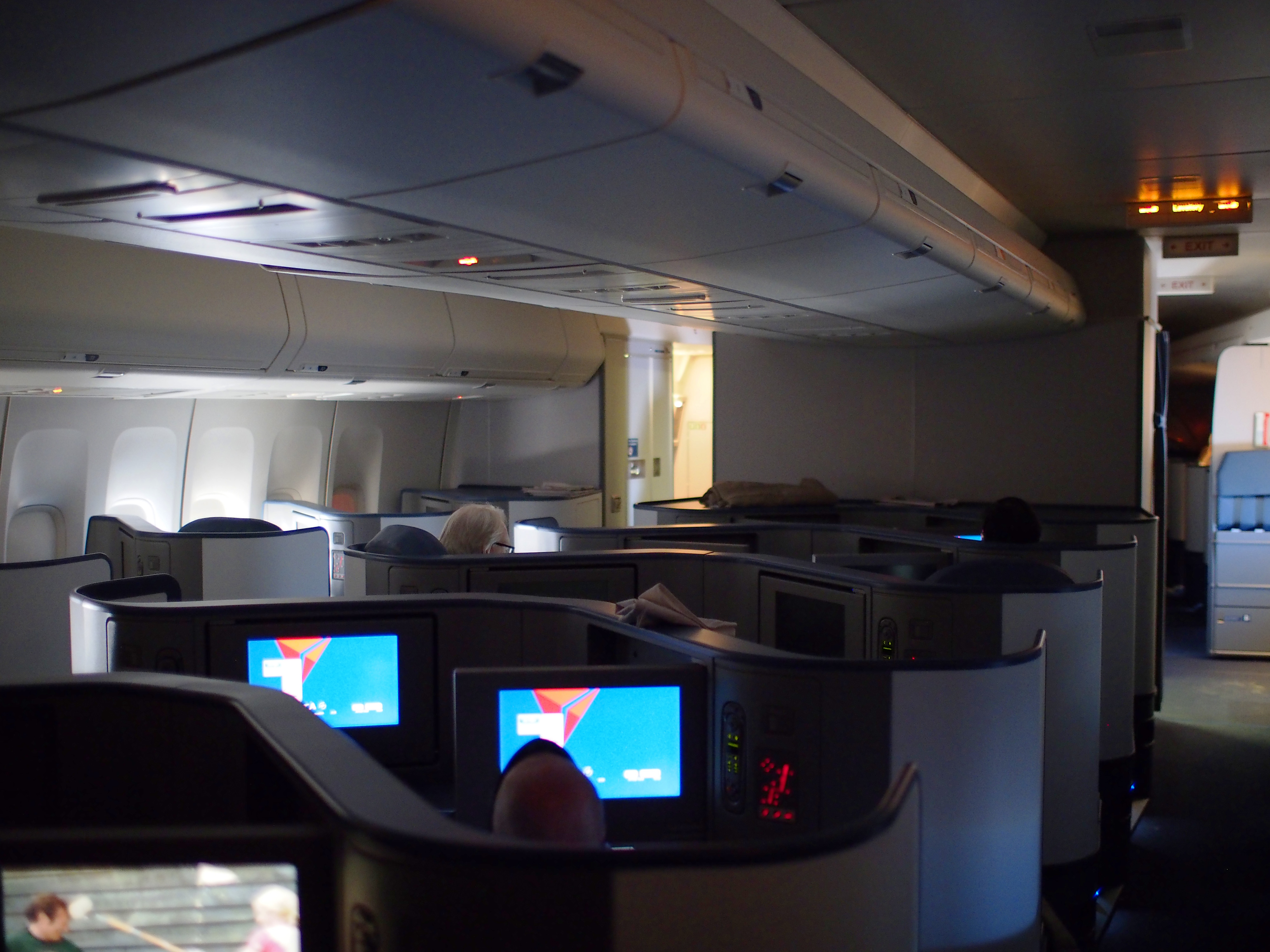
Delta Air Lines 747-400 main deck BusinessElite cabin

== Variants ==
=== 747-400 ===
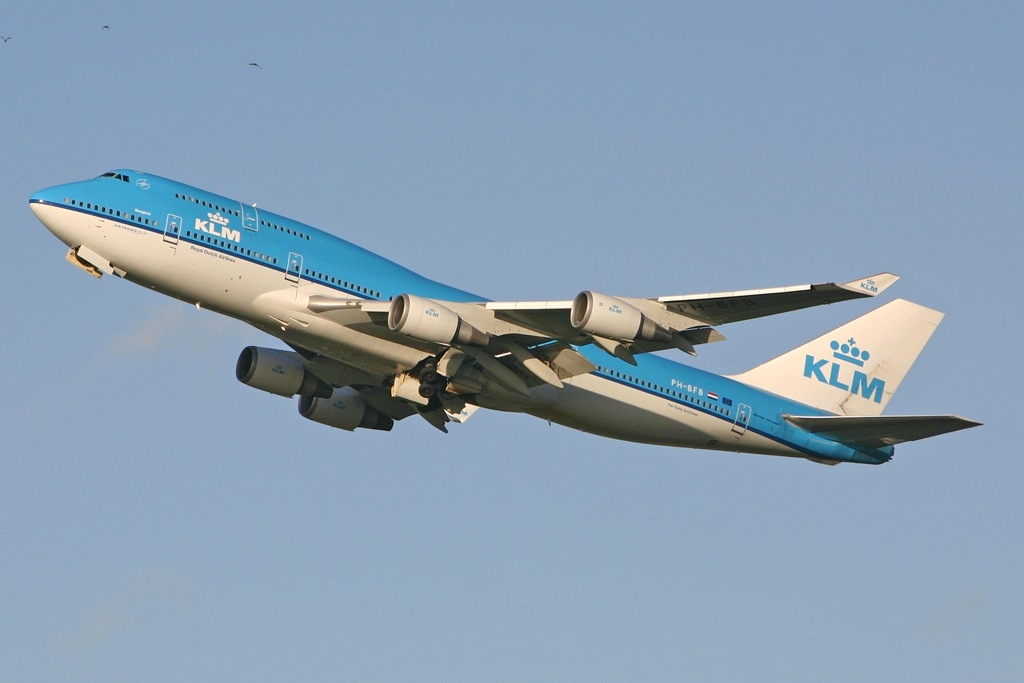
PH-BFB, a former KLM Boeing 747-400 named Bangkok (2006).

The original variant of the redesigned 747, the 747-400 debuted an increased wingspan, winglets, revised engines, and a glass cockpit which removed the need for a flight engineer. The type also featured the stretched upper deck (SUD) introduced with the 747-300. The passenger model formed the bulk of 747-400s sold, and 442 were built.

In 1989, the Qantas 747-400 VH-OJA flew non-stop from London Heathrow to Sydney, a distance of 18,001 km (11,185 mi), in 20 hours and 9 minutes to set a commercial aircraft world distance record. As of 2014, this is the fastest heavyweight flight between London and Sydney. This was a delivery flight with no commercial passengers or freight on board. During testing, the first 747-400 built also set a world record for the heaviest airliner takeoff on June 27, 1988, on a flight to simulate heavy-weight stalls. The aircraft had a takeoff weight of 892,450 pounds (404,810 kg), and in order to satisfy Fédération Aéronautique Internationale regulations, climbed to a height of 6,562 feet (2,000 m). On February 9, 2020, a British Airways Boeing 747-400 broke the New York–London subsonic airliner speed record in 4 hours 56 minutes, pushed by the powerful jet stream linked to Storm Ciara.

=== 747-400F ===
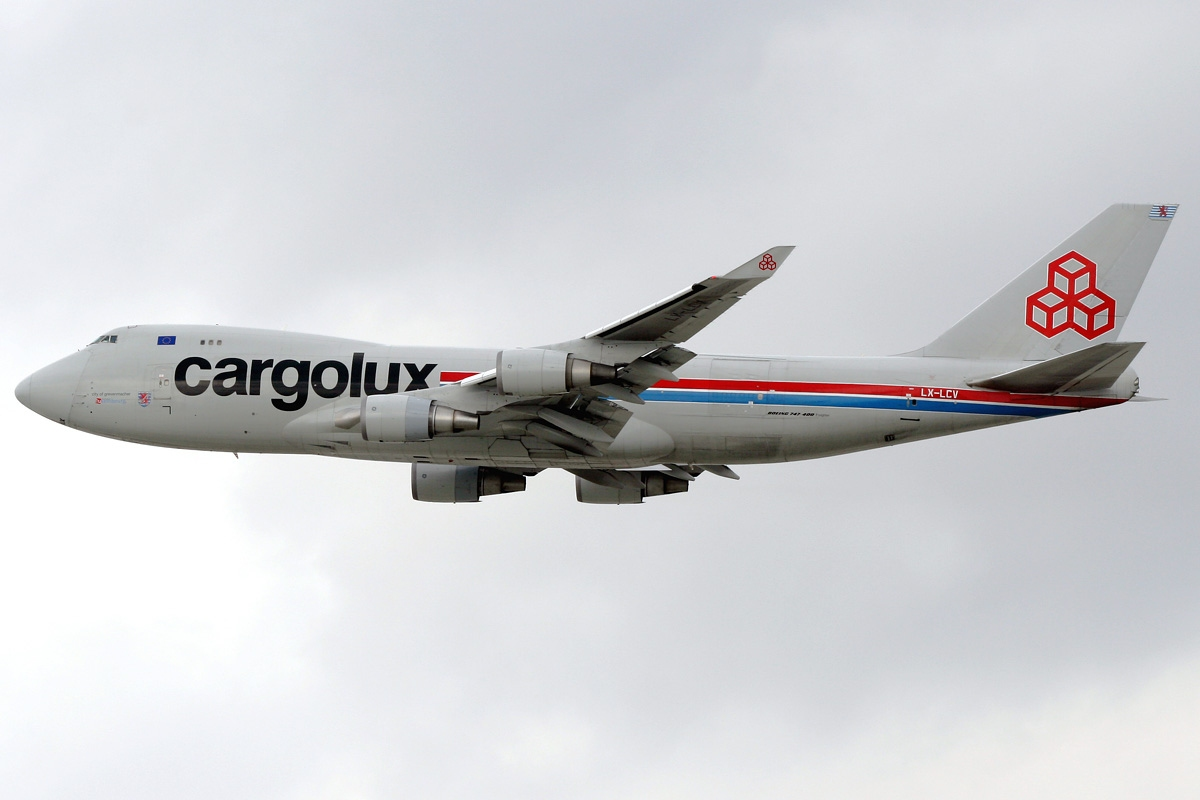
Cargolux Boeing 747-400F

The 747-400F (Freighter) is an all freight version of the 747-400. While using the updated systems and wing design of the passenger versions, it features the original short upper deck found on the classic 747s to reduce weight. The 747-400F has a maximum takeoff weight of 875,000 pounds (397,000 kg) and a maximum payload of 274,100 pounds (124,000 kg). The -400F can be easily distinguished from the passenger -400 by its shorter upper-deck hump and lack of windows along the main deck.

The model's first flight was on May 4, 1993, and it entered service with Cargolux on November 17, 1993. Other major customers included Atlas Air, China Airlines, Korean Air, Nippon Cargo Airlines and Singapore Airlines.

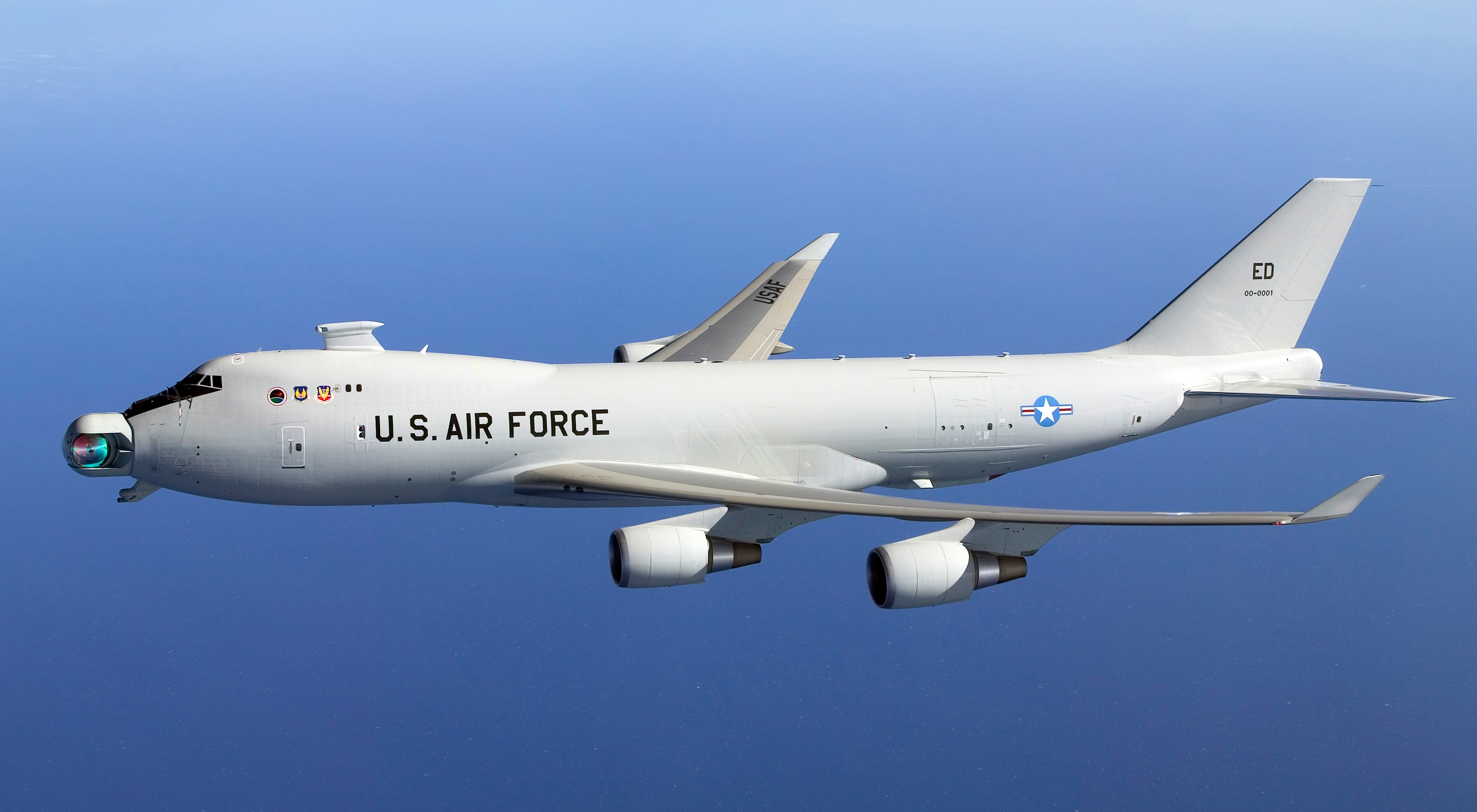
USAF Boeing YAL-1 carrying an airborne laser. It was formerly a Boeing 747-400F.

The 747-400F has a main deck nose door and a mechanized cargo handling system. The nose door swings up so that pallets or containers up to 40 ft (12 m) can be loaded straight in on motor-driven rollers. An optional main deck side cargo door (like the 747-400M Combi) allows loading of dimensionally taller cargo modules. A lower deck ("belly") side door allows loading of unit load devices (ULD) up to 64 inches (163 cm) in height. Boeing delivered 126 Boeing 747-400F aircraft with no unfilled orders as of November 2009. The last -400F was delivered to Nippon Cargo Airlines on August 2, 2008. The final 747-400-series freighter built was a 747-400ERF (Extended Range Freighter), which was delivered in December 2009.

=== 747-400M ===
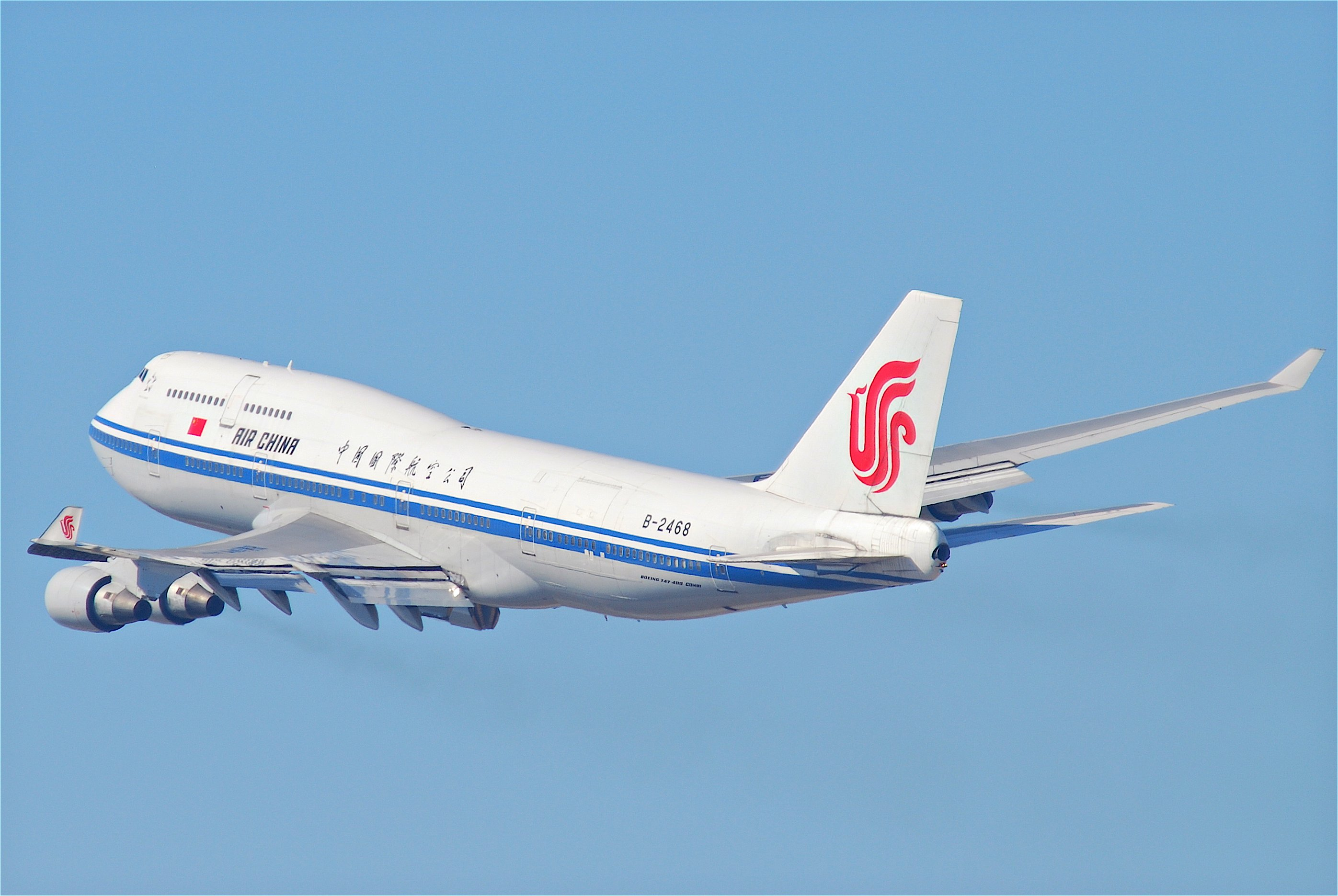
Air China 747-400M "Combi" in 2011 with aft cargo door

The 747-400M (a passenger/freight or "Combi" variant originally designated as 747-400BC) first flew on June 30, 1989, and entered service with KLM on September 12, 1989. Based on the successful Combi versions of the Classic 747s, the 747-400M has a large cargo door fitted to the rear of the fuselage for freight loading to the aft main deck cargo hold. A locked partition separates the cargo area from the forward passenger cabin, and the -400M also features additional fire protection, a strengthened main deck floor, a roller-conveyor system, and passenger-to-cargo conversion equipment. The last 747-400M was delivered to KLM on April 10, 2002. Boeing sold 61 747-400M aircraft, which was similar to earlier 747 "Combi" versions (78 747-200M, 21 747-300M).

KLM was the last commercial 747-400M operator. KLM initially planned to retire its Boeing 747-400M fleet by January 1, 2021. However, the aircraft were instead retired on March 27, 2020, after Air France-KLM announced in early March 2020 that all remaining KLM passenger 747-400s, including the 747-400M, would be withdrawn from service immediately due to the sharp decline in air travel caused by the COVID-19 pandemic. Despite this, a global shortage of air cargo capacity led to the temporary reactivation of three KLM 747-400Ms just one week later, allowing them to operate cargo-only flights to Asia. As of 2024, Air Atlanta Icelandic, an Icelandic cargo and charter passenger airline, operates one Boeing 747-400M.

=== 747-400D ===
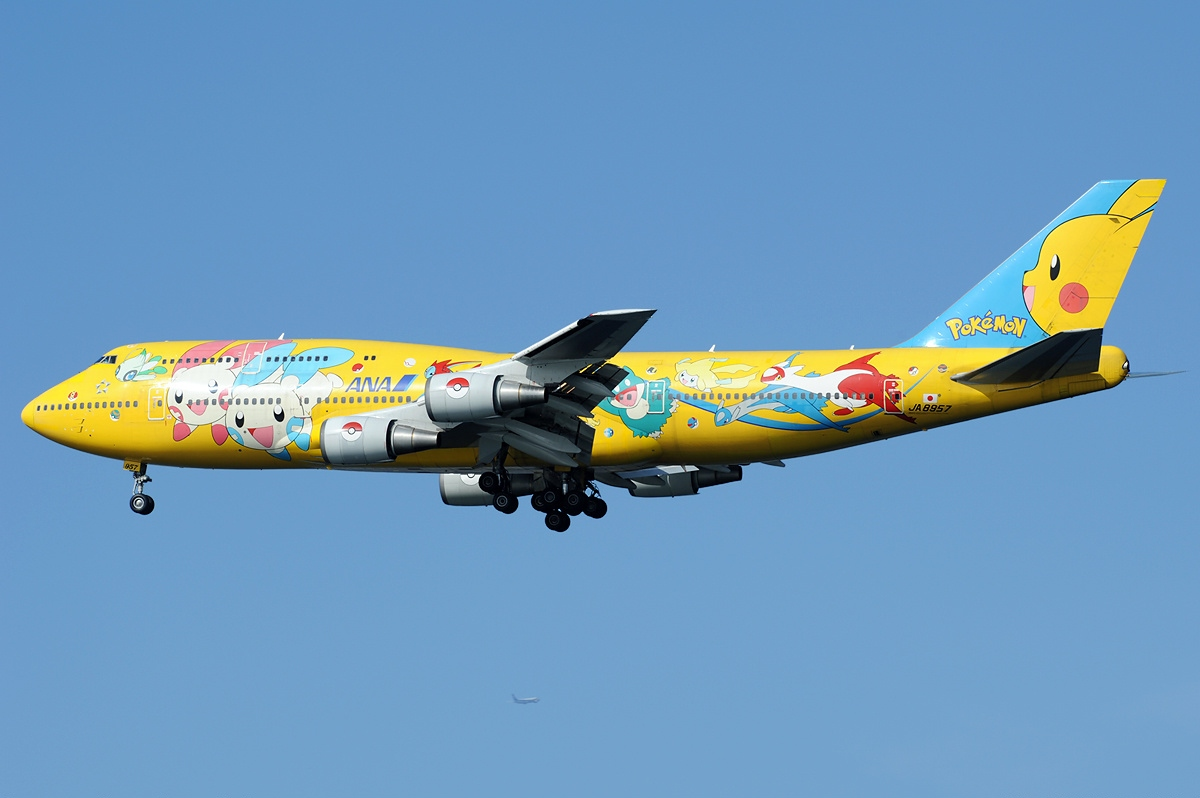
An All Nippon Airways Boeing 747-400D (Domestic) without winglets in the Pokémon Jet livery

The 747-400D (Domestic) is a high-density seating model developed for short-haul, high-volume domestic Japanese flights, serving the same role as the prior Boeing 747SR domestic model. This model is capable of seating a maximum of 568 passengers in a two-class configuration or 660 passengers in a single-class configuration.

The -400D lacks the wingtip extensions and winglets included on other variants. Winglets would provide minimal benefits on short-haul routes while adding extra weight and cost. The -400D may be converted to the long-range version if needed. The 747-400D can be distinguished from the otherwise similar-looking 747-300 by the extra windows on the upper deck. These allow for extra seating at the rear of the upper deck, where a galley would normally be situated on longer flights. In total, 19 of the type were built, with the last example delivered to All Nippon Airways on February 11, 1996. This variant was retired when ANA retired its last 747-400D on March 31, 2014.

=== 747-400ER ===
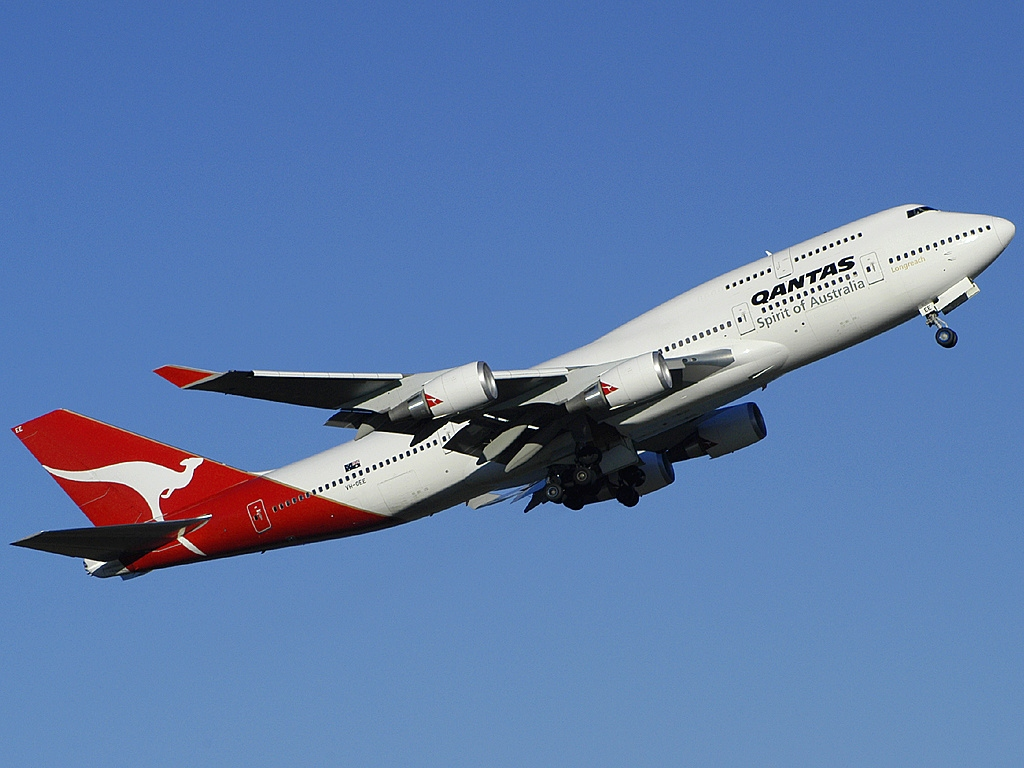
Qantas Boeing 747-400ER

The 747-400ER (Extended Range) was launched on November 28, 2000, following an order by Qantas for six aircraft. The model was commonly referred to as the '910k', reflecting its 910,000 lb (410 t) maximum takeoff weight, enabled through structural modifications and modified landing gear. The 747-400ER included the option of one or two additional 3,240 US gal (12,300 L; 2,700 imp gal) body fuel tanks in the forward cargo hold, but Qantas only ordered the single body tank configuration, and no airplanes were delivered with two body fuel tanks. Manufactured by Marshall Aerospace, the tanks used metal-to-metal honeycomb-bonded technology to achieve a high fuel volume-to-dry weight ratio. The tanks featured a double wall and an integrated venting system, and achieved fuel control via a modified Fuel System Management Card (FSMC) which optimized fuel transfer into the Center Wing Tank (CWT) in flight, along with fuel transfer from the Horizontal Stabiliser Tank (HST). The tank was removable using tooling that interfaced with the cargo loading system. Similar technology has been used by Marshall in the development of body fuel tanks for the Boeing 777-200LR and Boeing P-8A Poseidon. Other changes to the 747-400ER included the relocation of oxygen system components and the potable water system tanks and pumps, because the body fuel tanks prevent access to the standard locations.

The first 747-400ER was used as a test flight airplane and painted in Boeing colors, with registration N747ER. Qantas received the first delivery of a 747-400ER registration VH-OEF on October 31, 2002, although it was the second airplane built. The flight test airplane was later refurbished, repainted in standard Qantas livery, and registered as VH-OEE. Qantas was the only customer for the passenger version of the 747-400ER, chosen by the airline to allow for full loads between Melbourne and Los Angeles, particularly in the western direction. The 747-400ER could fly 500 miles (800 km) farther, or carry 15,000 lb (6,800 kg) more payload, than the -400.

In May 2018, Qantas announced that it would retire its 747 fleet by 2020. The last 747-400ER was retired in July 2020.

=== 747-400ERF ===
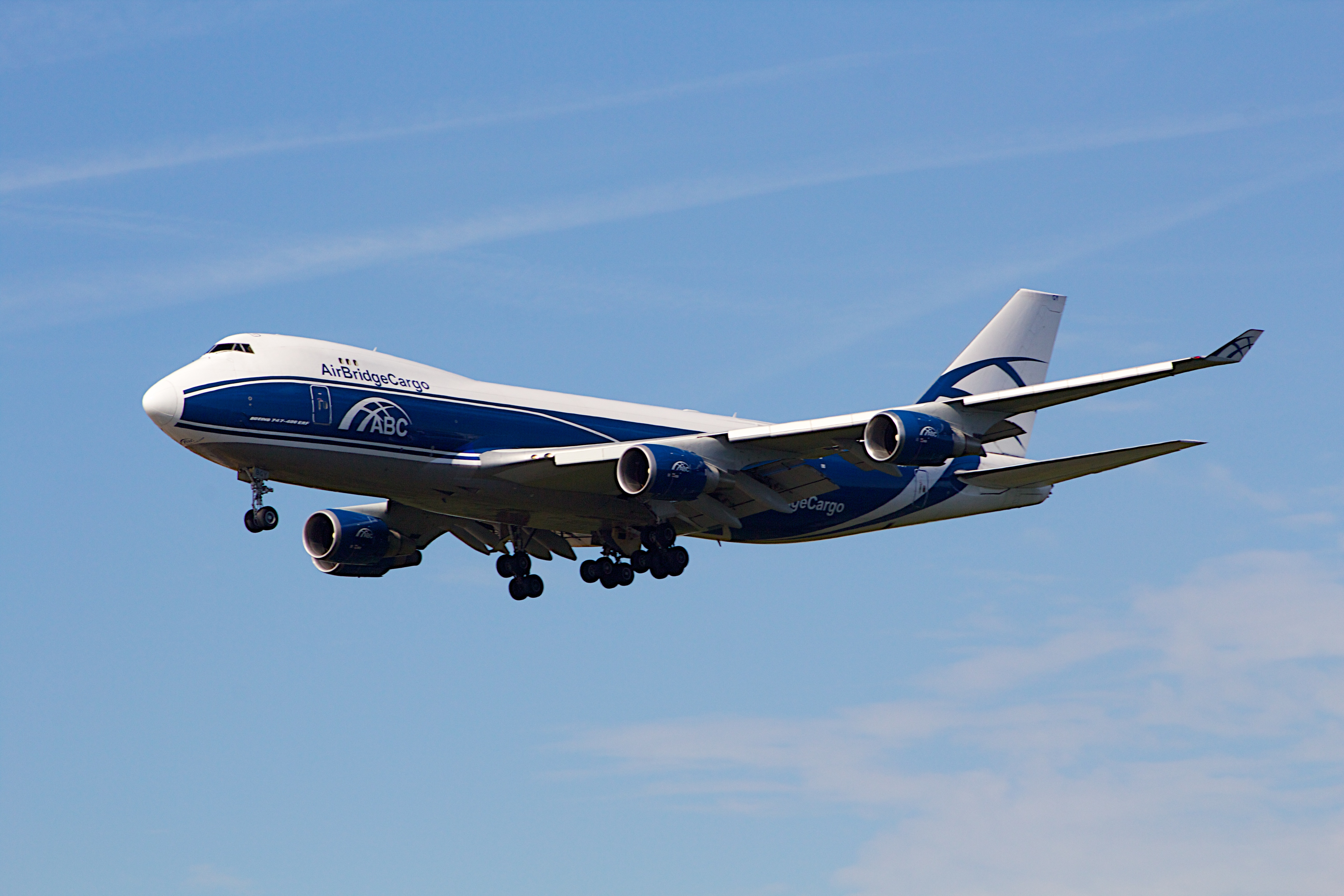
Air Bridge Cargo Boeing 747-400ERF Extended Range Freighter

The 747-400ERF (Extended Range Freighter) is the freight version of the -400ER, launched on April 30, 2001. The 747-400ERF is similar to the 747-400F, except for increased gross weight capability which allows it to carry more payload. Unlike the 747-400ER, no customers ordered the optional body (cargo compartment) fuel tanks which reflects the desire to carry more cargo, not fuel, as the benefit of the improved payload rating. The 747-400ERF has a maximum takeoff weight of 910,000 pounds (412,769 kg) and a maximum payload of 248,600 pounds (112,760 kg). It offers cargo airlines the choice of either adding 22,000 pounds (10,000 kg) more payload than other 747-400 freighter variants, or adding 525 nautical miles (972 km; 604 mi) to the maximum range.

The -400ERF has a range of 5,700 miles (9,200 km) with maximum payload, about 326 miles (525 km) farther than the standard 747-400 freighter, and has a strengthened fuselage, landing gear, and parts of its wing, along with new, larger tires. The first -400ERF was delivered to Air France (via ILFC) on October 17, 2002. Boeing has delivered 40 Boeing 747-400ERFs with no outstanding orders. The new 747-8 Freighter has more payload capacity, but less range than the 747-400ERF when both are at maximum takeoff weight.

=== Freighter conversions ===
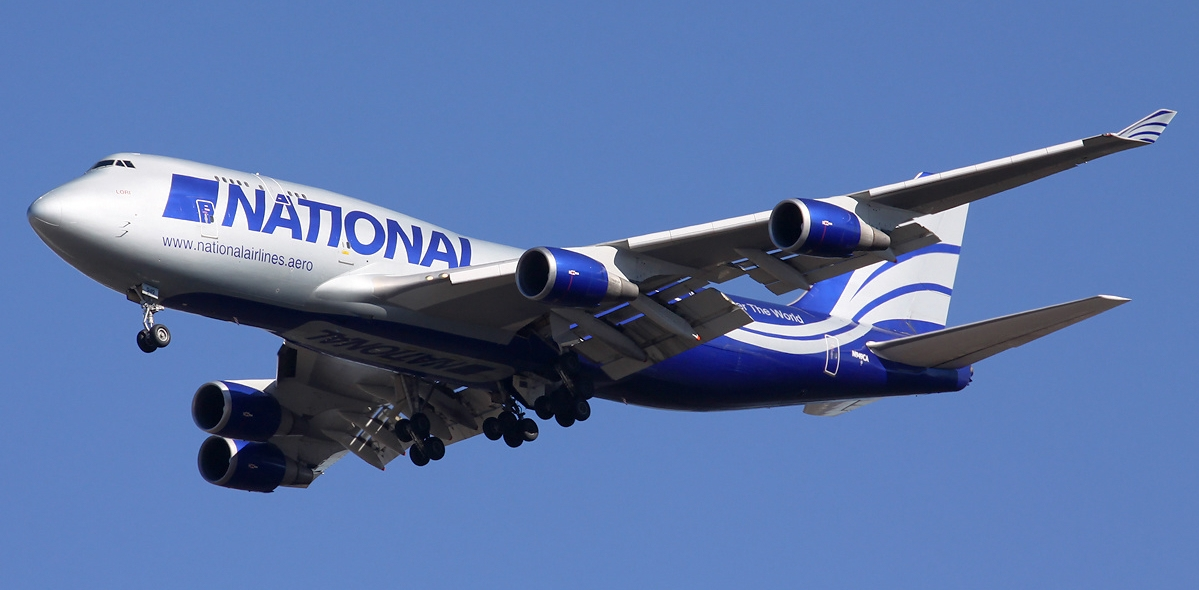
A Boeing 747-400BCF of National Airlines

The 747-400BCF (Boeing Converted Freighter), formerly known as the 747-400SF (Special Freighter), is a conversion program for standard passenger 747-400 aircraft. The project was launched in 2004 with conversions by approved contractors such as HAECO, KAL Aerospace, and SIA Engineering Company. The first Boeing 747-400BCF was redelivered to Cathay Pacific Cargo and entered service on December 20, 2005.

The 747-400BDSF (BeDek Special Freighter) is another passenger-to-freighter conversion, carried out by Israel Aerospace Industries (IAI). The first 747-400BDSF was redelivered to Air China Cargo in August 2006. Several Boeing 747-400M "combi" aircraft operated by EVA Air were also converted to pure cargo aircraft by IAI.

Neither the 747-400BCF nor the 747-400BDSF has a nose cargo door; freight can only be loaded through the side cargo door, as opposed to the newly produced freight variants.

The demand for converted 747-400 freighters declined in the early 2010s, due to the availability of belly cargo capacity on more efficient passenger wide-body twinjets, and new orders for Boeing 747-8F and 777F freighters. Approximately 79 747-400 aircraft were converted before the programs were terminated; 50 of these aircraft were converted by the BCF program, with the remaining 29 under the BDSF offering. Boeing announced the end of the BCF program for the 747-400 in 2016, although conversions had ceased years earlier, with no orders after 2012.

=== 747 Large Cargo Freighter ===
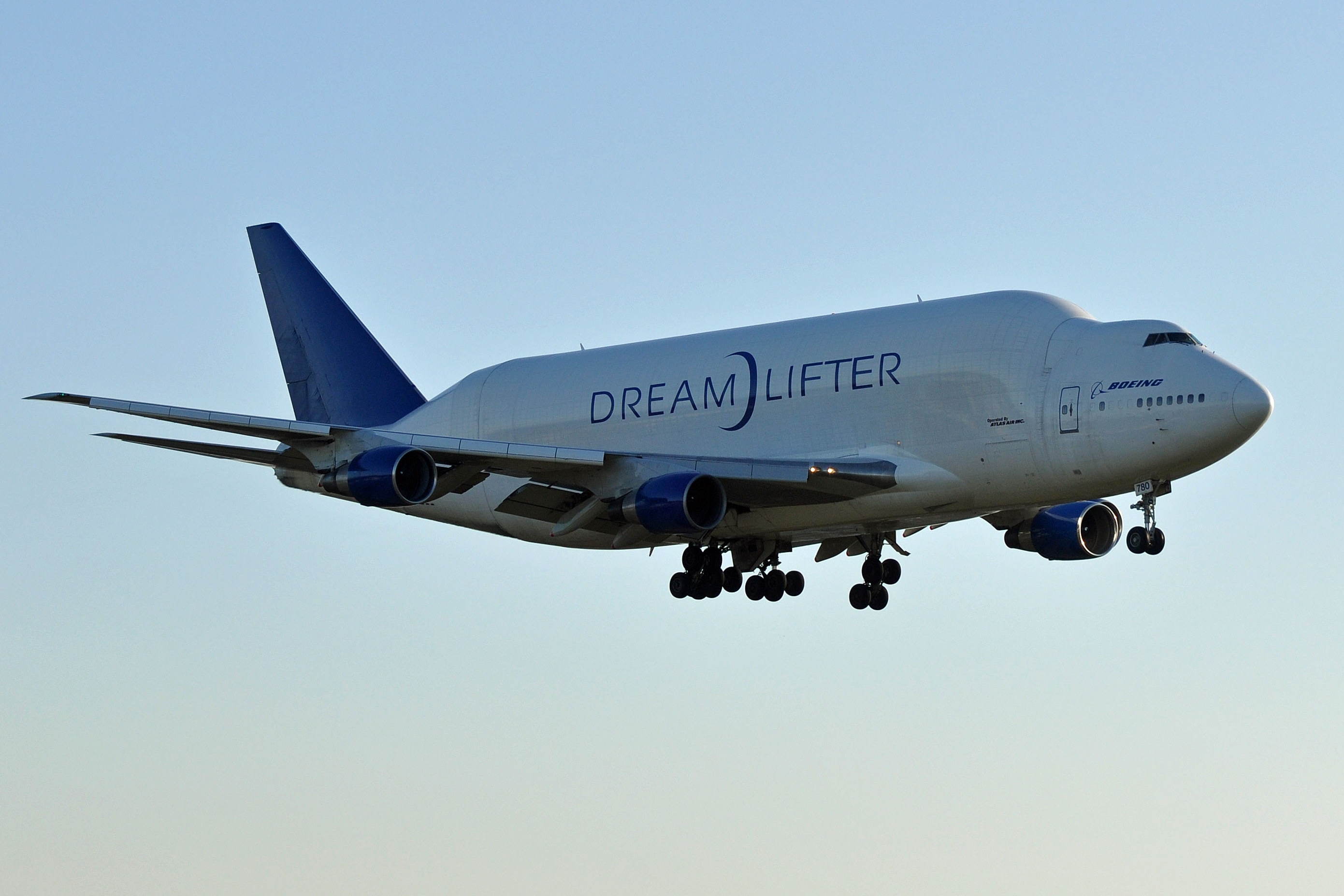
The Boeing Dreamlifter

Boeing announced in October 2003 that, because of the amount of time involved with marine shipping, air transport would be the primary method of transporting parts for the Boeing 787 Dreamliner. Used passenger 747-400 aircraft have been converted into an outsize, "Large Cargo Freighter" (LCF) configuration to ferry sub-assemblies to Everett, Washington for final assembly. The LCF has a bulging fuselage similar to that of the Aero Spacelines Super Guppy or Airbus Beluga cargo aircraft.

The conversion, designed by Boeing engineers from Puget Sound, Moscow and Canoga Park, Cal., and Gamesa Aeronáutica in Spain, was carried out in Taiwan by a subsidiary of the Evergreen Group. Boeing purchased four second-hand aircraft and had them all converted; the fourth and final LCF took its first flight in January 2010.

Delivery times are as low as one day using the 747 LCF, compared to up to 30 days for deliveries by ship. The LCF can hold three times the volume of a 747-400F freighter and had the largest cargo hold of any aircraft, until it was surpassed by the Airbus BelugaXL. The LCF is not a Boeing production model and has not been offered for sale to any customers. The LCFs are intended for Boeing's exclusive use.

=== Comparison ===
Below is a list of major differences between the 747-400 variants.

Model	747-400	747-400ER	747-400F	747-400ERF
Capacity	416 (23F @ 61" + 80J @ 39" + 313Y @ 32")		274,100 lb (124,330 kg)	273,400 lb (124,012 kg)
Unit Load Devices	30 LD1/LD3	28 LD1/LD3	+ 2 LD1 + 30 pallets (96" × 125") on Main deck	
Max. takeoff weight	875,000 lb (396,893 kg)	910,000 lb (412,769 kg)	875,000 lb (396,893 kg)	910,000 lb (412,769 kg)
Operating empty weight	PW: 404,600 lb (183,523 kg)	PW: 412,300 lb (187,016 kg)	GE: 360,900 lb (163,701 kg)	GE: 361,600 lb (164,019 kg)
Fuel capacity	57,285 US gal (216,850 L)	63,705 US gal (241,150 L)	53,985 US gal (204,360 L)	
Cruise	Mach 0.855 (491 kn; 910 km/h; 565 mph)		Mach 0.845 (485 kn; 899 km/h; 559 mph)	
Takeoff field length (Note: SL, 86 °F (30 °C), MTOW.)	9,700 ft (2,955 m)	10,700 ft (3,260 m)	9,550 ft (2,910 m)	10,700 ft (3,260 m)
Range	7,285 nmi (13,490 km; 8,385 mi) (Note: PW engines, 416 pax.)	7,585 nmi (14,045 km; 8,730 mi)	4,455 nmi (8,250 km; 5,125 mi) (Note: max. payload, max. TOW, GE Engines)	4,985 nmi (9,230 km; 5,735 mi) (Note: max. payload, max. TOW, PW engines)
Engines (× 4)	PW4000 / GE CF6 / RR RB211	PW4000 / GE CF6	PW4000 / GE CF6 / RR RB211	PW4000 / GE CF6
Thrust (× 4)	56,500–63,300 lbf (251–282 kN)	62,100–63,300 lbf (276–282 kN)	56,400–63,300 lbf (251–282 kN)	62,100–63,300 lbf (276–282 kN)

== Government, military and other variants ==
- C-33: Proposed U.S. military transport version of the 747-400F, intended as an alternative to further purchases of the McDonnell Douglas C-17 Globemaster III during the 1990s Non-Developmental Airlift Aircraft (NDAA) program. The C-33 cost less and had greater range, although it could not use austere runways or handle outsize military equipment and had a higher expected operating cost. The plan was canceled in favor of the purchase of more C-17s. In the early 2000s, An Air Power Australia analysis deck (an independent think tank not affiliated with the RAAF or Australia's Department of Defence) looked at modifying the 747-400 platform for use as KC-33 tankers but ultimately abandoned it in favor of the 767-based tanker.
- YAL-1: "Airborne Laser" carrier based on a 747-400F for the United States Air Force. The aircraft was heavily modified to carry a nose-mounted turret and Chemical Oxygen Iodine Laser (COIL) equipment in order to destroy Intercontinental Ballistic Missiles. The aircraft was retired in 2012 after cancellation of the program funding.
- Cosmic Girl: A former Virgin Atlantic 747-400 named Cosmic Girl is used by Virgin Galactic as the air launch to orbit launcher for LauncherOne, an orbital rocket.
- Evergreen 747 Supertanker: Global SuperTankers has converted an ex-Japan Airlines 747-400BCF for use as an airborne firefighter, serving as the second generation 747 Supertanker. The converted water bomber carries 19,600 US gallons (74,190 L) of water or chemical fire retardant in eight pressurized tanks. The United States Forest Service was considering the use of this aircraft in 2017. Global SuperTanker received FAA certification September 12, 2016.

== Operators ==
=== Deliveries ===
Type	Total	2009	2008	2007	2006	2005	2004	2003	2002	2001	2000	1999	1998	1997	1996	1995	1994	1993	1992	1991	1990	1989
747-400	442					2	3	6	5	19	9	34	43	30	18	16	32	42	47	48	54	34
747-400D	19															2	1	6	8	2		
747-400ER	6							3	3													
747-400ERF	40	6	6	8	6	2	5	4	3													
747-400F	126	2	8	8	8	9	7	6	15	12	15	10	8	4	3	5	4	2				
747-400M	61								1		1	3	2	5	5	2	3	6	6	12	8	7
Total	694	8	14	16	14	13	15	19	27	31	25	47	53	39	26	25	40	56	61	62	62	41

== Incidents and accidents ==
The Boeing 747-400 has been involved in several aviation occurrences. The deadliest occurred on October 31, 2000, when Singapore Airlines Flight 006 collided with construction equipment while attempting to take off from a closed runway at Taipei Airport. The aircraft broke apart and caught fire, killing 83 of the 179 people on board.

== Aircraft on display ==
VH-OJA City of Canberra, the first 747-400 preserved and delivered to Qantas, as well as record-breaker. Pictured at Historical Aircraft Restoration Society museum

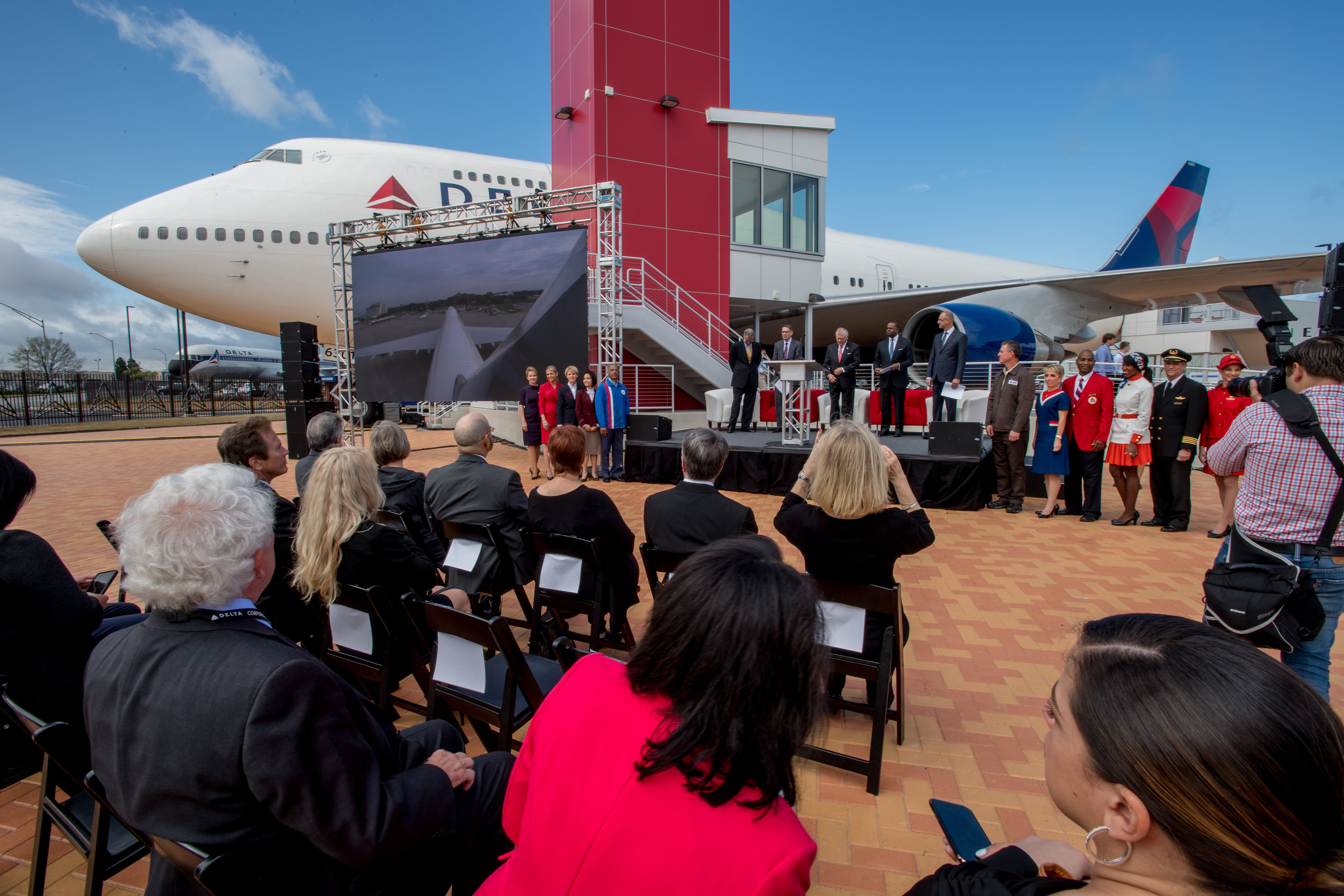
N661US, the first 747-400 built, preserved at the '747 Experience' exhibit, Delta Flight Museum

Following the gradual withdrawal of older examples of the type from passenger service from the early-2010s onward, a relatively large number of Boeing 747-400s have entered preservation after being decommissioned.

- Qantas 747-400 VH-OJA City of Canberra, the first 747-400 delivered to the airline, is displayed at the Historical Aircraft Restoration Society museum at Shellharbour Airport, Australia. It was the first to be preserved and holds the record for the longest non-stop flight undertaken by a commercial aircraft, from London to Sydney in 20 hours, 9 minutes and 5 seconds, a record it has held since 1989.
- N661US, a former Delta Air Lines example, is on display at the Delta Flight Museum at Hartsfield-Jackson Atlanta International Airport in Atlanta, Georgia. The aircraft was the first -400 series built, serving as the prototype (then registered N401PW) prior to delivery to Northwest Airlines in December 1989. It is also the aircraft that was involved in Northwest Airlines Flight 85.
- In February 2019, a former KLM 747-400 registered PH-BFB and named City of Bangkok was transported on a giant trailer from Schiphol airport across fields, main roads and meadows to the Corendon Village Hotel in Badhoevedorp, having been repainted into Corendon's livery beforehand. To make this transport possible, the Motorway A9 was closed during the night from Friday February 8 until Saturday February 9. The aircraft was hauled a total of 12.5 kilometres over fields and roads to reach its new home at the hotel. Upon arrival at the hotel, the aircraft was installed in the grounds of the hotel complex.
- Air China 747-400M B-2468 is on display at Shijingshan Amusement Park in Beijing, China. The aircraft was retired in May 2013 and subsequently reassembled and opened to the public as the "Aero-Space City" (飞天城) attraction in 2018.
- PK-LHF, last operated by Lion Air was converted for use as the Steak 21 restaurant in Summarecon Bekasi, Indonesia. The plane was originally operated by Singapore Airlines registered 9V-SMC.
- British Airways has preserved five of its 747-400's following the fleet's retirement during the COVID-19 pandemic, although only four now remain.
  - G-BYGC, the first of British Airways' three retrojets and decorated with the British Overseas Airways Corporation livery was on display at Bro Tathan Airfield, within the Bro Tathan Business Park at St Athan, Vale of Glamorgan, Wales. G-BYGC arrived at Bro Tathan for preservation on 11 December 2020. By May 2023, however, the aircraft was in danger of being scrapped. By August 2023, the dismantling of the aircraft was confirmed.
  - G-BNLY City of Swansea, the second of British Airways' three retrojets and wearing the classic Landor Associates livery used from the 1980s to the late 1990s is on display at Dunsfold Aerodrome, joining 747-400 G-CIVW and 747-200 G-BDXJ as a filming location. The announcement of its preservation was made at the same time as that of G-BYGC, meaning that as of December 2020, all three of BA's heritage-liveried 747s have been preserved. G-BNLY arrived at Dunsfold on 5 December 2020 after a ferry flight from Cardiff.
  - G-CIVB, the third of three 747-400 retrojets formerly operated by British Airways, is on display at Cotswold Airport in Kemble, Gloucestershire in the United Kingdom. The aircraft, which was the joint last of BA's 747-400s to leave London Heathrow alongside G-CIVY, arrived at Kemble on 8 October 2020. G-CIVB is decorated with the Negus livery used by the airline during the 1970s and early 1980s, and has been modified for use as an events centre.
  - G-CIVW, an ex-British Airways 747-400, arrived at Dunsfold Aerodrome, Surrey in the United Kingdom on 22 October 2020 for preservation after a final ferry flight from Cardiff. The aircraft, which wears the Chattam Dockyard livery joins the aerodrome's Boeing 747-200, G-BDXJ, for use as a filming location and trainer aircraft.
  - G-BYGA, one of British Airways last 747-400's used for flying, was retired on 8 September 2020. The cockpit and partial upper deck was converted into an event space and flight simulator at the Barton City Airport known as 'The Deck' in August 2022.
- HS-STA, A former Orient Thai Boeing 747-400 was converted into a cafe and restaurant in Bangkok's Lat Krabang district. The airplane originally belonged to United Airlines, registered N187UA.
- HS-STB, A former Orient Thai Boeing 747-400 has a fuselage without wing preserved at Flight of Happiness restaurant in Guanyin District, Taoyuan, Taiwan.
- HS-TGR Siriwatthana, A former Thai Airways 747-400 was purchased by a Thai businessman named Somchai Phukieow in July 2018 and had it shipped to his home in Chai Nat Province, Thailand The aircraft had its engines removed and the titles painted over, but is otherwise unchanged from its time in active service.
- HS-TGT Watthanothai, A former Thai Airways 747-400, has been placed on static display at Chic Chic Market in Nong Khai, Thailand, alongside ex-Las Vegas Sands Lockheed L-1011 TriStar N388LS.
- N940AS, A former Air India 747-400, (previously registered VT-EVA), was sold to AerSale and then purchased by the Soloviev Foundation, owned by Quintin Soloviev, has been preserved at Roswell International Air Center, New Mexico. The Air India titles have been removed but the livery remains on the plane.

== Specifications (Boeing 747-400 with PW4062 engines) ==
Data from

General characteristics

- Crew: 2
- Capacity: 416 passengers (three-class configuration) , 6,085 cu ft (172.3 m^{3}) cargo (up to 9 pallets or 30 LD1/LD3 containers)
- Fuel capacity: 57,285 US gal (216,840 L)

Performance

- Maximum speed: Mach 0.92
- Takeoff distance: 9,700 ft (2,955 m)
- Landing distance: 7,150 ft (2,175 m)

== See also ==
- Competition between Airbus and Boeing

Related development

- Boeing YAL-1
- Boeing 747-8
- 747 Supertanker

Related lists

- List of civil aircraft
- List of Boeing 747 operators
