= Dick Negus =

British graphic designer (1927–2011)

Richard Charles Negus (29 August 1927 – 22 April 2011) was a British graphic designer, who created a design identity for British Airways.

His parents moved to London from Quendon in Essex. He was educated at Battersea Grammar School. In 1943 he joined the Royal Marines, and was invalided out in 1945. He then studied at Camberwell School of Art.

His first job was designing exhibitions for the 1951 Festival of Britain. He founded Negus and Sharland with Philip Sharland, producing illustrations for clients such as Philips Records.

His first wife was Pamela Wheatcroft-Hancock, who he met at Camberwell and married in 1949. They had three children. Together they founded Negus and Negus in 1970. Clients included British Airways, Lloyds Bank, John Laing Group, the City of Westminster, the National Exhibition Centre, Pakistan International Airlines, Emirates airline, the Social Democratic Party, Vickers and Rolls-Royce Motors, English Heritage, Royal Armouries, the National Maritime Museum, the Tower of London, and the Royal Opera House.

Negus was president of the Chartered Society of Designers from 1977 to 1978, a Fellow of the Royal Society of Arts, a council member of the Design Council, a Fellow of the Society of Typographic Designers. He became a governor of the Camberwell School of Art and the Chelsea School of Art, a member of the court of the Royal College of Art and he served for 25 years on the Post Office stamps advisory committee.

He retired in 1988, and took up sailing in his yacht Sigyn. Pamela died in 2000 and Negus married Aurea.
